= September 11, 2001 Terrorist Attack/Casualties =

The 2977 victims who fell from the catostrophic incident of september 11/2001 were Gordon M. Aamoth, Jr. S-49

Edelmiro Abad S-40

Marie Rose Abad S-34

Andrew Anthony Abate N-57

Vincent Paul Abate N-57

Laurence Christopher Abel N-32

Alona Abraham S-4

William F. Abrahamson N-7

Richard Anthony Aceto N-4

Heinrich Bernhard Ackermann S-55

Paul Acquaviva N-37

Christian Adams S-68

Donald LaRoy Adams N-55

Patrick Adams S-45

Shannon Lewis Adams N-49

Stephen George Adams N-70

Ignatius Udo Adanga N-71

Christy A. Addamo N-8

Terence Edward Adderley, Jr. N-58

Sophia B. Addo N-68

Lee Adler N-37

Daniel Thomas Afflitto N-25

Emmanuel Akwasi Afuakwah N-71

Alok Agarwal N-36

Mukul Kumar Agarwala S-43

Joseph Agnello S-11

David Scott Agnes N-47

Joao Alberto da Fonseca Aguiar, Jr. S-34

Brian G. Ahearn S-13

Jeremiah Joseph Ahern S-47

Joanne Marie Ahladiotis N-37

Shabbir Ahmed N-70

Terrance Andre Aiken N-17

Godwin O. Ajala S-65

Trudi M. Alagero N-5

Andrew Alameno N-52

Margaret Ann Alario S-63

Gary M. Albero S-63

Jon Leslie Albert N-7

Peter Craig Alderman N-21

Jacquelyn Delaine Aldridge- Frederick N-10

David D. Alger N-59

Ernest Alikakos S-47

Edward L. Allegretto N-40

Eric Allen S-21

Joseph Ryan Allen N-41

Richard Dennis Allen S-21

Richard L. Allen N-19

Christopher E. Allingham N-42

Anna S. W. Allison N-2

Janet Marie Alonso N-5

Anthony Alvarado N-23

Antonio Javier Alvarez N-70

Victoria Alvarez-Brito N-8

Telmo E. Alvear N-71

Cesar Amoranto Alviar N-16

Tariq Amanullah S-42

Angelo Amaranto N-64

James M. Amato S-7

Joseph Amatuccio S-24

Paul W. Ambrose S-70

Christopher Charles Amoroso S-28

Craig Scott Amundson S-74

Kazuhiro Anai N-63

Calixto Anaya, Jr. S-21

Joseph P. Anchundia S-52

Kermit Charles Anderson N-9

Yvette Constance Anderson S-48

John Jack Andreacchio S-44

Michael Rourke Andrews N-53

Jean Ann Andrucki N-66

Siew-Nya Ang N-5

Joseph Angelini, Sr. S-9

Joseph John Angelini, Jr. S-9

David Lawrence Angell N-1

Mary Lynn Edwards Angell N-1

Laura Angilletta N-32

Doreen J. Angrisani N-15

Lorraine Antigua N-53

Seima David Aoyama N-2

Peter Paul Apollo N-26

Faustino Apostol, Jr. S-6

Frank Thomas Aquilino N-39

Patrick Michael Aranyos S-30

David Gregory Arce S-13

Michael George Arczynski S-54

Louis Arena S-5

Barbara Jean Arestegui N-74

Adam P. Arias S-31

Michael J. Armstrong N-43

Jack Charles Aron N-4

Joshua Todd Aron N-42

Richard Avery Aronow N-66

Myra Joy Aronson N-74

Japhet Jesse Aryee S-48

Carl Francis Asaro S-10

Michael A. Asciak N-63

Michael Edward Asher N-36

Janice Marie Ashley N-58

Thomas J. Ashton N-19

Manuel O. Asitimbay N-68

Gregg A. Atlas S-5

Gerald Thomas Atwood S-11

James Audiffred N-64

Louis F. Aversano, Jr. S-58

Ezra Aviles N-65

Sandy Ayala N-70

B

Arlene T. Babakitis N-66

Eustace R. Bacchus N-71

John J. Badagliacca N-52

Jane Ellen Baeszler N-43

Robert J. Baierwalter S-63

Andrew J. Bailey N-12

Brett T. Bailey S-31

Garnet Ace Bailey S-3

Tatyana Bakalinskaya N-17

Michael S. Baksh N-16

Sharon M. Balkcom N-7

Michael Andrew Bane N-14

Katherine Bantis N-12

Gerard Baptiste S-14

Walter Baran S-40

Gerard A. Barbara S-18

Paul Vincent Barbaro N-36

James William Barbella S-26

Victor Daniel Barbosa S-37

Christine Johnna Barbuto N-1

Colleen Ann Barkow N-32

David Michael Barkway N-42

Matthew Barnes S-21

Melissa Rose Barnes S-72

Sheila Patricia Barnes S-58

Evan Jay Baron N-60

Renee Barrett-Arjune N-48

Arthur Thaddeus Barry S-20

Diane G. Barry S-56

Maurice Vincent Barry S-28

Scott D. Bart N-9

Carlton W. Bartels N-50

Guy Barzvi N-48

Inna B. Basina N-48

Alysia Christine Burton Basmajian N-47

Kenneth William Basnicki N-21

Steven Joseph Bates S-6

Paul James Battaglia N-4

W. David Bauer N-37

Ivhan Luis Carpio Bautista N-69

Marlyn Capito Bautista N-6

Mark Lawrence Bavis S-3

Jasper Baxter S-45

Lorraine G. Bay S-67

Michele Beale N-20

Todd M. Beamer S-68

Paul Frederick Beatini S-63

Jane S. Beatty N-9

Alan Anthony Beaven S-67

Lawrence Ira Beck N-31

Manette Marie Beckles S-42

Carl John Bedigian S-21

Michael Ernest Beekman S-48

Maria A. Behr N-27

Max J. Beilke S-1

Yelena Belilovsky N-61

Nina Patrice Bell N-8

Debbie S. Bellows N-37

Stephen Elliot Belson S-17

Paul M. Benedetti S-62

Denise Lenore Benedetto S-60

Bryan Craig Bennett N-55

Eric L. Bennett N-65

Oliver Bennett N-20

Margaret L. Benson N-66

Dominick J. Berardi N-31

James Patrick Berger S-56

Steven Howard Berger S-48

John P. Bergin S-6

Alvin Bergsohn N-25

Daniel David Bergstein N-66

Graham Andrew Berkeley S-3

Michael J. Berkeley N-67

Donna M. Bernaerts N-16

David W. Bernard S-66

William H. Bernstein N-56

David M. Berray N-20

David Shelby Berry S-36

Joseph John Berry S-36

William Reed Bethke N-10

Yeneneh Betru S-69

Timothy D. Betterly N-41

Carolyn Mayer Beug N-1

Edward Frank Beyea N-65

Paul Michael Beyer S-14

Anil Tahilram Bharvaney N-22

Bella J. Bhukhan N-49

Shimmy D. Biegeleisen S-42

Peter Alexander Bielfeld S-18

William G. Biggart S-66

Brian Eugene Bilcher S-14

Mark Bingham S-67

Carl Vincent Bini S-6

Gary Eugene Bird N-13

Joshua David Birnbaum N-42

George John Bishop S-59

Kris Romeo Bishundat S-72

Jeffrey Donald Bittner S-35

Albert Balewa Blackman, Jr. N-48

Christopher Joseph Blackwell S-15

Carrie Rosetta Blagburn S-1

Susan Leigh Blair S-56

Harry Blanding, Jr. S-62

Janice Lee Blaney N-16

Craig Michael Blass N-28

Rita Blau S-41

Richard Middleton Blood, Jr. S-62

Michael Andrew Boccardi N-59

John Paul Bocchi N-46

Michael L. Bocchino S-19

Susan M. Bochino S-62

Deora Frances Bodley S-68

Bruce Douglas Boehm N-41

Mary Catherine Murphy Boffa N-3

Nicholas Andrew Bogdan N-13

Darren Christopher Bohan S-56

Lawrence Francis Boisseau S-23

Vincent M. Boland, Jr. N-10

Touri Hamzavi Bolourchi S-4

Alan Bondarenko S-65

Andre Bonheur, Jr. N-58

Colin Arthur Bonnett N-14

Frank J. Bonomo S-12

Yvonne Lucia Bonomo N-18

Sean Booker, Sr. N-19

Kelly Ann Booms N-1

Canfield D. Boone S-74

Mary Jane Booth S-69

Sherry Ann Bordeaux S-42

Krystine Bordenabe S-34

Jerry J. Borg S-66

Martin Michael Boryczewski N-26

Richard Edward Bosco N-58

Klaus Bothe S-3

Carol Marie Bouchard N-75

J. Howard Boulton S-31

Francisco Eligio Bourdier S-38

Thomas Harold Bowden, Jr. N-26

Donna M. Bowen S-75

Kimberly S. Bowers N-36

Veronique Nicole Bowers N-70

Larry Bowman S-65

Shawn Edward Bowman, Jr. N-49

Kevin L. Bowser N-16

Gary R. Box S-6

Gennady Boyarsky N-18

Pamela Boyce N-58

Allen P. Boyle S-73

Michael Boyle S-13

Alfred J. Braca N-41

Sandra Conaty Brace N-18

Kevin Hugh Bracken S-15

Sandy Waugh Bradshaw S-67

David Brian Brady N-22

Alexander Braginsky N-22

Nicholas W. Brandemarti S-33

Daniel Raymond Brandhorst S-4

David Reed Gamboa Brandhorst S-4

Michelle Renee Bratton N-34

Patrice Braut N-10

Lydia Estelle Bravo N-11

Ronald Michael Breitweiser S-42

Edward A. Brennan III N-53

Frank H. Brennan N-55

Michael E. Brennan S-10

Peter Brennan S-8

Thomas More Brennan S-52

Daniel J. Brethel S-17

Gary Lee Bright S-64

Jonathan Eric Briley N-68

Mark A. Brisman S-45

Paul Gary Bristow N-20

Marion R. Britton S-67

Mark Francis Broderick N-28

Herman Charles Broghammer S-58

Keith A. Broomfield N-64

Bernard C. Brown II S-70

Janice Juloise Brown N-11

Lloyd Stanford Brown N-29

Patrick John Brown S-8

Bettina B. Browne-Radburn S-61

Mark Bruce S-52

Richard George Bruehert N-5

Andrew Brunn S-6

Vincent Edward Brunton S-20

Ronald Bucca S-14

Brandon J. Buchanan N-29

Greg J. Buck S-12

Dennis Buckley N-43

Nancy Clare Bueche S-61

Patrick Joseph Buhse N-53

John Edward Bulaga, Jr. N-34

Stephen Bruce Bunin N-37

Christopher L. Burford S-71

Matthew J. Burke N-29

Thomas Daniel Burke N-54

William Francis Burke, Jr. S-18

Charles F. Burlingame III S-69

Thomas E. Burnett, Jr. S-68

Donald J. Burns S-18

Kathleen Anne Burns S-43

Keith James Burns N-28

John Patrick Burnside S-12

Irina Buslo S-44

Milton G. Bustillo N-34

Thomas M. Butler S-7

Patrick Dennis Byrne S-8

Timothy G. Byrne S-50

C

Daniel M. Caballero S-72

Jesus Neptali Cabezas N-68

Lillian Caceres N-4

Brian Joseph Cachia N-34

Steven Dennis Cafiero, Jr. S-55

Richard Michael Caggiano N-26

Cecile Marella Caguicla N-7

John Brett Cahill S-3

Michael John Cahill N-11

Scott Walter Cahill N-42

Thomas Joseph Cahill N-40

George C. Cain S-20

Salvatore B. Calabro S-8

Joseph M. Calandrillo N-18

Philip V. Calcagno N-15

Edward Calderon S-26

Jose O. Calderon-Olmedo S-74

Kenneth Marcus Caldwell N-65

Dominick E. Calia N-43

Felix Bobby Calixte N-73

Francis Joseph Callahan S-17

Liam Callahan S-29

Suzanne M. Calley S-71

Gino Luigi Calvi N-51

Roko Camaj S-37

Michael F. Cammarata S-15

David Otey Campbell S-34

Geoffrey Thomas Campbell N-22

Robert Arthur Campbell S-44

Sandra Patricia Campbell N-37

Sean Thomas Canavan S-64

John A. Candela N-26

Vincent A. Cangelosi N-41

Stephen J. Cangialosi N-43

Lisa Bella Cannava N-58

Brian Cannizzaro S-8

Michael R. Canty N-61

Louis Anthony Caporicci N-53

Jonathan Neff Cappello N-52

James Christopher Cappers N-15

Richard Michael Caproni N-10

Jose Manuel Cardona N-62

Dennis M. Carey, Sr. S-7

Edward Carlino N-11

Michael Scott Carlo S-12

David G. Carlone S-63

Rosemarie C. Carlson N-67

Mark Stephen Carney N-65

Joyce Ann Carpeneto N-72

Jeremy Caz Carrington N-45

Michael T. Carroll S-8

Peter J. Carroll S-6

James Joseph Carson, Jr. N-35

Christoffer Mikael Carstanjen S-3

Angelene C. Carter S-76

James Marcel Cartier S-64

Sharon Ann Carver S-1

Vivian Casalduc N-65

John Francis Casazza N-52

Paul Regan Cascio S-30

Neilie Anne Heffernan Casey N-75

William Joseph Cashman S-68

Thomas Anthony Casoria S-18

William Otto Caspar N-13

Alejandro Castaño S-38

Arcelia Castillo N-5

Leonard M. Castrianno N-44

Jose Ramon Castro N-23

William E. Caswell S-70

Richard G. Catarelli N-9

Christopher Sean Caton N-54

Robert John Caufield N-19

Mary Teresa Caulfield N-9

Judson Cavalier S-52

Michael Joseph Cawley S-11

Jason David Cayne N-43

Juan Armando Ceballos S-37

Marcia G. Cecil-Carter N-63

Jason Michael Cefalu N-56

Thomas Joseph Celic N-12

Ana Mercedes Centeno N-14

Joni Cesta S-38

John J. Chada S-1

Jeffrey Marc Chairnoff S-51

Swarna Chalasani S-42

William A. Chalcoff N-16

Eli Chalouh S-48

Charles Lawrence Chan N-44

Mandy Chang S-44

Rosa Maria Chapa S-71

Mark Lawrence Charette N-4

David M. Charlebois S-69

Gregorio Manuel Chavez N-70

Pedro Francisco Checo S-39

Douglas MacMillan Cherry S-60

Stephen Patrick Cherry N-26

Vernon Paul Cherry S-11

Nestor Julio Chevalier, Jr. N-33

Swede Joseph Chevalier N-28

Alexander H. Chiang N-10

Dorothy J. Chiarchiaro N-58

Luis Alfonso Chimbo N-70

Robert Chin S-39

Eddie Wing-Wai Ching N-23

Nicholas Paul Chiofalo S-7

John G. Chipura S-21

Peter A. Chirchirillo N-5

Catherine Ellen Chirls N-55

Kyung Hee Casey Cho N-14

Abul K. Chowdhury N-36

Mohammad Salahuddin Chowdhury N-67

Kirsten Lail Christophe S-54

Pamela Chu N-29

Steven Paul Chucknick S-31

Wai Ching Chung S-53

Christopher Ciafardini N-60

Alex F. Ciccone N-8

Frances Ann Cilente N-37

Elaine Cillo N-6

Edna Cintron N-12

Nestor Andre Cintron III N-44

Robert D. Cirri, Sr. S-29

Juan Pablo Cisneros N-52

Benjamin Keefe Clark S-39

Eugene Clark S-56

Gregory Alan Clark N-31

Mannie Leroy Clark N-10

Sara M. Clark S-70

Thomas R. Clark S-51

Christopher Robert Clarke S-50

Donna Marie Clarke N-14

Michael J. Clarke S-16

Suria Rachel Emma Clarke N-34

Kevin Francis Cleary S-32

James D. Cleere N-5

Geoffrey W. Cloud N-47

Susan Marie Clyne N-8

Steven Coakley S-13

Jeffrey Alan Coale N-69

Patricia A. Cody N-8

Daniel Michael Coffey N-5

Jason Matthew Coffey N-5

Florence G. Cohen S-47

Kevin S. Cohen N-33

Anthony Joseph Coladonato N-36

Mark Joseph Colaio N-42

Stephen J. Colaio N-42

Christopher Michael Colasanti N-53

Kevin Nathaniel Colbert S-35

Michel P. Colbert N-52

Keith E. Coleman N-30

Scott Thomas Coleman N-30

Tarel Coleman S-23

Liam Joseph Colhoun N-73

Robert D. Colin S-61

Robert J. Coll S-31

Jean Marie Collin S-63

John Michael Collins S-22

Michael L. Collins N-36

Thomas Joseph Collins S-50

Joseph Kent Collison N-72

Jeffrey Dwayne Collman N-74

Patricia Malia Colodner N-6

Linda M. Colon N-3

Sol E. Colon S-58

Ronald Edward Comer N-11

Jaime Concepcion N-70

Albert Conde S-63

Denease Conley S-65

Susan P. Conlon N-73

Margaret Mary Conner N-31

Cynthia Marie Lise Connolly S-56

John E. Connolly, Jr. S-32

James Lee Connor S-50

Jonathan M. Connors N-25

Kevin Patrick Connors S-30

Kevin F. Conroy N-4

Brenda E. Conway N-12

Dennis Michael Cook N-40

Helen D. Cook N-72

Jeffrey W. Coombs N-2

John A. Cooper S-49

Julian T. Cooper S-73

Joseph John Coppo, Jr. N-43

Gerard J. Coppola N-63

Joseph Albert Corbett N-53

John J. Corcoran III S-4

Alejandro Cordero N-6

Robert Joseph Cordice S-7

Ruben D. Correa S-9

Danny A. Correa-Gutierrez N-7

Georgine Rose Corrigan S-68

James J. Corrigan, Ret. S-5

Carlos Cortés-Rodriguez S-65

Kevin Michael Cosgrove S-60

Dolores Marie Costa N-58

Digna Alexandra Costanza N-13

Charles Gregory Costello, Jr. N-64

Michael S. Costello N-26

Asia S. Cottom S-70

Conrod Kofi Cottoy, Sr. N-62

Martin John Coughlan S-64

John G. Coughlin S-23

Timothy J. Coughlin N-54

James E. Cove S-59

Andre Colin Cox N-23

Frederick John Cox S-50

James Raymond Coyle S-7

Michele Coyle-Eulau N-11

Christopher Seton Cramer S-42

Eric A. Cranford S-72

Denise Elizabeth Crant N-10

James Leslie Crawford, Jr. N-27

Robert James Crawford S-18

Tara Kathleen Creamer N-75

Joanne Mary Cregan N-37

Lucia Crifasi N-18

John A. Crisci S-8

Daniel Hal Crisman N-15

Dennis A. Cross S-6

Kevin R. Crotty S-52

Thomas G. Crotty S-53

John R. Crowe S-55

Welles Remy Crowther S-50

Robert L. Cruikshank N-58

John Robert Cruz N-49

Grace Alegre Cua S-39

Kenneth John Cubas S-43

Francisco Cruz Cubero S-65

Thelma Cuccinello N-1

Richard Joseph Cudina N-51

Neil James Cudmore N-20

Thomas Patrick Cullen III S-13

Joan Cullinan N-31

Joyce Rose Cummings S-39

Brian Thomas Cummins N-27

Michael Joseph Cunningham S-31

Robert Curatolo S-19

Laurence Damian Curia N-41

Paul Dario Curioli S-63

Patrick Joseph Currivan N-74

Beverly L. Curry N-35

Andrew Peter Charles Curry Green N-1

Michael Sean Curtin S-24

Patricia Cushing S-67

Gavin Cushny N-31

D

Caleb Arron Dack N-21

Carlos S. da Costa S-25

Jason M. Dahl S-67

Brian Paul Dale N-76

John D’Allara S-24

Vincent Gerard D’Amadeo N-32

Thomas A. Damaskinos N-32

Jack L. D’Ambrosi, Jr. N-45

Jeannine Damiani-Jones N-42

Manuel João DaMota N-71

Patrick W. Danahy S-40

Mary D’Antonio N-6

Vincent G. Danz S-24

Dwight Donald Darcy N-66

Elizabeth Ann Darling N-12

Annette Andrea Dataram N-69

Edward A. D’Atri S-6

Michael D. D’Auria S-16

Lawrence Davidson S-62

Michael Allen Davidson N-30

Scott Matthew Davidson S-10

Titus Davidson S-46

Niurka Davila N-66

Ada M. Davis S-75

Clinton Davis, Sr. S-28

Wayne Terrial Davis N-21

Anthony Richard Dawson N-22

Calvin Dawson S-32

Edward James Day S-15

William Thomas Dean N-11

Robert J. DeAngelis, Jr. S-64

Thomas Patrick DeAngelis S-16

Dorothy Alma de Araujo S-4

Ana Gloria Pocasangre Debarrera S-2

Tara E. Debek N-9

James D. Debeuneure S-70

Anna M. DeBin N-47

James V. DeBlase, Jr. N-51

Jayceryll Malabuyoc de Chavez S-40

Paul DeCola N-36

Gerald F. DeConto S-72

Simon Marash Dedvukaj N-64

Jason Christopher DeFazio N-40

David A. DeFeo S-49

Jennifer De Jesus S-46

Monique Effie DeJesus N-29

Nereida De Jesus S-60

Emy De La Peña S-40

Donald Arthur Delapenha S-36

Azucena Maria de la Torre N-47

Vito Joseph DeLeo N-63

Danielle Anne Delie N-3

Joseph A. Della Pietra N-40

Andrea DellaBella S-58

Palmina DelliGatti N-4

Colleen Ann Deloughery S-59

Joseph DeLuca S-68

Manuel Del Valle, Jr. S-16

Francis Albert De Martini S-27

Anthony Demas S-55

Martin N. DeMeo S-9

Francis Deming N-17

Carol Keyes Demitz S-42

Kevin Dennis N-44

Thomas Francis Dennis, Sr. N-56

Jean C. DePalma N-12

Jose Nicolas De Pena N-69

Robert John Deraney N-21

Michael DeRienzo N-53

David Paul DeRubbio S-14

Jemal Legesse DeSantis N-58

Christian Louis DeSimone N-4

Edward DeSimone III N-53

Andrew J. Desperito S-18

Michael Jude D’Esposito N-6

Cindy Ann Deuel N-59

Melanie Louise de Vere N-20

Jerry DeVito N-60

Robert P. Devitt, Jr. N-32

Dennis Lawrence Devlin S-15

Gerard P. Dewan S-8

Sulemanali Kassamali Dhanani S-53

Michael Louis DiAgostino N-49

Matthew Diaz N-24

Nancy Diaz N-70

Obdulio Ruiz Diaz N-71

Michael A. Diaz-Piedra III N-72

Judith Berquis Diaz-Sierra S-40

Patricia Florence Di Chiaro N-8

Rodney Dickens S-70

Jerry D. Dickerson S-74

Joseph Dermot Dickey, Jr. N-46

Lawrence Patrick Dickinson N-67

Michael D. Diehl S-40

John Difato N-58

Vincent Francis DiFazio N-55

Carl Anthony DiFranco N-4

Donald Joseph DiFranco N-64

John DiGiovanni N-73

Eddie A. Dillard S-70

Debra Ann Di Martino S-36

David DiMeglio N-2

Stephen Patrick Dimino N-53

William John Dimmling N-12

Christopher More Dincuff N-60

Jeffrey Mark Dingle N-21

Rena Sam Dinnoo N-12

Anthony Dionisio N-33

George DiPasquale S-17

Joseph Di Pilato S-46

Douglas Frank DiStefano N-49

Donald Americo DiTullio N-75

Ramzi A. Doany N-14

Johnnie Doctor, Jr. S-72

John Joseph Doherty S-60

Melissa Cándida Doi S-46

Brendan Dolan N-61

Robert E. Dolan, Jr. S-73

Neil Matthew Dollard N-40

James Domanico S-48

Benilda Pascua Domingo S-37

Alberto Dominguez N-2

Carlos Dominguez N-3

Jerome Mark Patrick Dominguez S-25

Kevin W. Donnelly S-6

Jacqueline Donovan S-33

William H. Donovan S-73

Stephen Scott Dorf S-32

Thomas Dowd N-55

Kevin Christopher Dowdell S-11

Mary Yolanda Dowling S-59

Raymond Matthew Downey, Sr. S-9

Frank Joseph Doyle S-34

Joseph Michael Doyle N-33

Randall L. Drake S-38

Patrick Joseph Driscoll S-68

Stephen Patrick Driscoll S-24

Charles A. Droz III S-70

Mirna A. Duarte N-16

Luke A. Dudek N-70

Christopher Michael Duffy S-35

Gerard J. Duffy S-10

Michael Joseph Duffy S-35

Thomas W. Duffy N-4

Antoinette Duger N-72

Jackie Sayegh Duggan N-69

Sareve Dukat S-48

Patrick Dunn S-72

Felicia Gail Dunn-Jones S-66

Christopher Joseph Dunne N-13

Richard Anthony Dunstan S-59

Patrick Thomas Dwyer N-25

E

Joseph Anthony Eacobacci N-50

John Bruce Eagleson S-66

Edward T. Earhart S-72

Robert Douglas Eaton N-46

Dean Phillip Eberling S-33

Margaret Ruth Echtermann S-48

Paul Robert Eckna N-28

Constantine Economos S-51

Barbara G. Edwards S-70

Dennis Michael Edwards N-54

Michael Hardy Edwards S-50

Christine Egan S-53

Lisa Erin Egan N-49

Martin J. Egan, Jr. S-11

Michael Egan S-53

Samantha Martin Egan N-49

Carole Eggert N-6

Lisa Caren Ehrlich S-62

John Ernst Eichler N-71

Eric Adam Eisenberg S-58

Daphne Ferlinda Elder N-8

Michael J. Elferis S-18

Mark Joseph Ellis S-25

Valerie Silver Ellis N-25

Albert Alfy William Elmarry N-36

Robert R. Elseth S-73

Edgar Hendricks Emery, Jr. S-41

Doris Suk-Yuen Eng N-70

Christopher Epps N-6

Ulf Ramm Ericson S-65

Erwin L. Erker N-5

William John Erwin N-46

Sarah Ali Escarcega N-20

Jose Espinal S-66

Fanny Espinoza N-47

Billy Scoop Esposito N-40

Bridget Ann Esposito N-18

Francis Esposito S-7

Michael A. Esposito S-7

Ruben Esquilin, Jr. S-39

Sadie Ette N-69

Barbara G. Etzold N-59

Eric Brian Evans S-59

Robert Edward Evans S-15

Meredith Emily June Ewart S-54

F

Catherine K. Fagan N-13

Patricia Mary Fagan S-55

Ivan Kyrillos Fairbanks-Barbosa N-43

Keith George Fairben S-26

Sandra Fajardo-Smith N-7

Charles S. Falkenberg S-69

Dana Falkenberg S-69

Zoe Falkenberg S-69

Jamie L. Fallon S-72

William F. Fallon N-65

William Lawrence Fallon, Jr. N-37

Anthony J. Fallone, Jr. N-51

Dolores Brigitte Fanelli N-5

Robert John Fangman S-2

John Joseph Fanning S-11

Kathleen Anne Faragher N-22

Thomas James Farino S-19

Nancy C. Doloszycki Farley N-18

Paige Marie Farley-Hackel N-75

Elizabeth Ann Farmer N-47

Douglas Jon Farnum N-10

John Gerard Farrell N-53

John W. Farrell S-51

Terrence Patrick Farrell S-11

Joseph D. Farrelly S-22

Thomas Patrick Farrelly N-17

Syed Abdul Fatha S-49

Christopher Edward Faughnan N-54

Wendy R. Faulkner S-61

Shannon Marie Fava N-35

Bernard D. Favuzza N-42

Robert Fazio, Jr. S-24

Ronald Carl Fazio, Sr. S-60

William M. Feehan S-18

Francis Jude Feely N-7

Garth Erin Feeney N-21

Sean Bernard Fegan N-60

Lee S. Fehling S-7

Peter Adam Feidelberg S-54

Alan D. Feinberg S-10

Rosa Maria Feliciano N-15

Edward P. Felt S-68

Edward Thomas Fergus, Jr. N-41

George J. Ferguson III S-37

J. Joseph Ferguson S-69

Henry Fernandez N-70

Judy Hazel Santillan Fernandez N-36

Julio Fernandez S-45

Elisa Giselle Ferraina N-20

Anne Marie Sallerin Ferreira N-44

Robert John Ferris S-60

David Francis Ferrugio N-56

Louis V. Fersini, Jr. N-43

Michael David Ferugio S-63

Bradley James Fetchet S-35

Jennifer Louise Fialko S-59

Kristen Nicole Fiedel N-6

Amelia V. Fields S-75

Samuel Fields S-65

Alexander Milan Filipov N-2

Michael Bradley Finnegan N-45

Timothy J. Finnerty N-52

Michael C. Fiore S-5

Stephen J. Fiorelli N-66

Paul M. Fiori N-24

John B. Fiorito N-41

John R. Fischer S-13

Andrew Fisher N-22

Bennett Lawson Fisher S-40

Gerald P. Fisher S-75

John Roger Fisher N-66

Thomas J. Fisher S-41

Lucy A. Fishman S-61

Ryan D. Fitzgerald S-40

Thomas James Fitzpatrick S-52

Richard P. Fitzsimons S-23

Salvatore Fiumefreddo N-24

Darlene E. Flagg S-70

Wilson F. Flagg S-70

Christina Donovan Flannery S-50

Eileen Flecha S-41

Andre G. Fletcher S-7

Carl M. Flickinger N-40

Matthew M. Flocco S-72

John Joseph Florio S-22

Joseph Walkden Flounders S-32

Carol Ann Flyzik N-1

David Fodor S-41

Michael N. Fodor S-11

Stephen Mark Fogel N-47

Thomas J. Foley S-16

Jane C. Folger S-67

David J. Fontana S-6

Chih Min Foo S-44

Delrose E. Forbes Cheatham N-48

Godwin Forde S-46

Donald A. Foreman S-27

Christopher Hugh Forsythe N-44

Claudia Alicia Foster N-56

Noel John Foster S-62

Sandra N. Foster S-71

Ana Fosteris S-61

Robert Joseph Foti S-20

Jeffrey Fox S-35

Virginia Elizabeth Fox N-10

Pauline Francis N-24

Virgin Lucy Francis N-69

Gary Jay Frank S-58

Morton H. Frank N-26

Peter Christopher Frank N-59

Colleen L. Fraser S-68

Richard K. Fraser S-59

Kevin J. Frawley S-33

Clyde Frazier, Jr. S-27

Lillian Inez Frederick S-58

Andrew Fredericks S-21

Tamitha Freeman S-58

Brett Owen Freiman S-46

Peter L. Freund S-7

Arlene Eva Fried N-46

Alan W. Friedlander S-58

Andrew Keith Friedman N-59

Paul J. Friedman N-75

Gregg J. Froehner S-29

Lisa Anne Frost S-3

Peter Christian Fry S-32

Clement A. Fumando N-33

Steven Elliot Furman N-50

Paul James Furmato N-26

Karleton Douglas Beye Fyfe N-1

G Fredric Neal Gabler N-26

Richard Peter Gabriel S-70

Richard S. Gabrielle S-55

James Andrew Gadiel N-31

Pamela Lee Gaff S-55

Ervin Vincent Gailliard S-66

Deanna Lynn Galante and her

unborn child N-37

Grace Catherine Galante N-37

Anthony Edward Gallagher N-50

Daniel James Gallagher N-28

John Patrick Gallagher N-49

Lourdes J. Galletti N-47

Cono E. Gallo N-61

Vincent Gallucci N-5

Thomas E. Galvin N-39

Giovanna Galletta Gambale N-34

Thomas Gambino, Jr. S-15

Giann F. Gamboa S-37

Ronald L. Gamboa S-4

Peter James Ganci, Jr. S-17

Michael Gann N-20

Charles William Garbarini S-12

Andrew Sonny Garcia S-68

Cesar R. Garcia N-5

David Garcia N-17

Jorge Luis Morron Garcia S-65

Juan Garcia N-23

Marlyn Del Carmen Garcia N-3

Christopher Samuel Gardner S-57

Douglas Benjamin Gardner N-38

Harvey Joseph Gardner III N-72

Jeffrey Brian Gardner N-4

Thomas A. Gardner S-8

William Arthur Gardner N-37

Frank Garfi N-25

Rocco Nino Gargano N-28

James M. Gartenberg N-64

Matthew David Garvey S-6

Bruce Gary S-15

Boyd Alan Gatton S-43

Donald Richard Gavagan, Jr. N-42

Peter Alan Gay N-2

Terence D. Gazzani N-51

Gary Paul Geidel S-10

Paul Hamilton Geier N-51

Julie M. Geis S-57

Peter Gerard Gelinas N-56

Steven Paul Geller N-29

Howard G. Gelling, Jr. S-51

Peter Victor Genco, Jr. N-41

Steven Gregory Genovese N-26

Alayne Gentul S-42

Linda M. George N-75

Edward F. Geraghty S-9

Suzanne Geraty N-35

Ralph Gerhardt N-45

Robert Gerlich N-18

Denis P. Germain S-16

Marina Romanovna Gertsberg N-48

Susan M. Getzendanner S-40

Lawrence D. Getzfred S-72

James G. Geyer N-55

Cortez Ghee S-75

Joseph M. Giaccone N-36

Vincent Francis Giammona S-6

Debra Lynn Gibbon S-54

James Andrew Giberson S-16

Brenda C. Gibson S-1

Craig Neil Gibson N-16

Ronnie E. Gies S-8

Andrew Clive Gilbert N-45

Timothy Paul Gilbert N-45

Paul Stuart Gilbey S-32

Paul John Gill S-9

Mark Y. Gilles N-50

Evan Hunter Gillette S-50

Ronald Lawrence Gilligan N-33

Rodney C. Gillis S-24

Laura Gilly N-35

John F. Ginley S-16

Donna Marie Giordano S-55

Jeffrey John Giordano S-8

John Giordano S-18

Steven A. Giorgetti N-13

Martin Giovinazzo N-3

Kum-Kum Girolamo S-54

Salvatore Gitto N-10

Cynthia Giugliano N-64

Mon Gjonbalaj S-37

Dianne Gladstone S-47

Keith Alexander Glascoe S-11

Thomas Irwin Glasser S-49

Edmund Glazer N-75

Harry Glenn N-16

Barry H. Glick N-66

Jeremy Logan Glick S-67

Steven Glick N-21

John T. Gnazzo N-32

William Robert Godshalk S-35

Michael Gogliormella N-35

Brian F. Goldberg S-42

Jeffrey G. Goldflam N-38

Michelle Goldstein S-62

Monica Goldstein N-48

Steven Ian Goldstein N-50

Ronald F. Golinski S-75

Andrew H. Golkin N-46

Dennis James Gomes S-43

Enrique Antonio Gomez N-68

Jose Bienvenido Gomez N-68

Manuel Gomez, Jr. S-44

Wilder Alfredo Gomez N-69

Jenine Nicole Gonzalez S-53

Mauricio Gonzalez S-64

Rosa J. Gonzalez N-66

Lynn Catherine Goodchild S-3

Calvin Joseph Gooding N-39

Peter Morgan Goodrich S-3

Harry Goody S-48

Kiran Kumar Reddy Gopu N-8

Catherine C. Gorayeb N-22

Lisa Fenn Gordenstein N-75

Kerene Gordon N-24

Sebastian Gorki S-38

Kieran Joseph Gorman S-36

Thomas Edward Gorman S-28

Michael Edward Gould N-25

O. Kristin Osterholm White Gould S-68

Douglas Alan Gowell S-4

Yuji Goya S-45

Jon Richard Grabowski N-15

Christopher Michael Grady N-46

Edwin J. Graf III N-41

David Martin Graifman S-34

Gilbert Franco Granados S-58

Lauren Catuzzi Grandcolas and

her unborn child S-68

Elvira Granitto N-64

Winston Arthur Grant N-65

Christopher S. Gray N-44

Ian J. Gray S-71

James Michael Gray S-13

Tara McCloud Gray N-72

John M. Grazioso N-25

Timothy George Grazioso N-25

Derrick Auther Green S-42

Wade B. Green N-23

Wanda Anita Green S-67

Elaine Myra Greenberg N-20

Donald Freeman Greene S-67

Gayle R. Greene N-9

James Arthur Greenleaf, Jr. N-62

Eileen Marsha Greenstein S-56

Elizabeth Martin Gregg N-59

Denise Marie Gregory N-63

Donald H. Gregory N-39

Florence Moran Gregory S-58

Pedro Grehan N-51

John Michael Griffin N-63

Tawanna Sherry Griffin N-23

Joan Donna Griffith S-39

Warren Grifka N-15

Ramon B. Grijalvo N-65

Joseph F. Grillo N-66

David Joseph Grimner N-12

Francis Edward Grogan S-4

Linda Gronlund S-68

Kenneth George Grouzalis S-25

Joseph Grzelak S-19

Matthew James Grzymalski N-54

Robert Joseph Gschaar S-53

Liming Gu N-3

Richard J. Guadagno S-67

Jose A. Guadalupe S-10

Cindy Yan Zhu Guan S-48

Geoffrey E. Guja S-12

Joseph P. Gullickson S-9

Babita Girjamatie Guman S-39

Douglas Brian Gurian N-39

Janet Ruth Gustafson S-61

Philip T. Guza S-53

Barbara Guzzardo S-55

Peter Mark Gyulavary S-65

H

Gary Robert Haag N-5

Andrea Lyn Haberman N-61

Barbara Mary Habib N-9

Philip Haentzler N-73

Nezam A. Hafiz N-6

Karen Elizabeth Hagerty S-54

Steven Michael Hagis N-55

Mary Lou Hague S-35

David Halderman S-21

Maile Rachel Hale N-21

Diane Hale-McKinzy S-1

Richard B. Hall S-54

Stanley R. Hall S-70

Vaswald George Hall N-67

Robert J. Halligan S-54

Vincent Gerard Halloran S-13

Carolyn B. Halmon S-75

James Douglas Halvorson N-7

Mohammad Salman Hamdani S-66

Felicia Hamilton S-41

Robert W. Hamilton S-12

Carl Max Hammond, Jr. S-3

Frederic K. Han N-46

Christopher James Hanley N-22

Sean S. Hanley S-12

Valerie Joan Hanna N-9

Thomas Paul Hannafin S-5

Kevin James Hannaford, Sr. N-50

Michael Lawrence Hannan N-10

Dana Rey Hannon S-19

Christine Lee Hanson S-4

Peter Burton Hanson S-4

Sue Kim Hanson S-4

Vassilios G. Haramis S-65

James A. Haran N-51

Gerald Francis Hardacre S-4

Jeffrey Pike Hardy N-24

T.J. Hargrave N-55

Daniel Edward Harlin S-16

Frances Haros S-35

Harvey L. Harrell S-5

Stephen G. Harrell S-5

Melissa Harrington-Hughes N-22

Aisha Ann Harris N-72

Stewart D. Harris N-47

John Patrick Hart S-39

Eric Hartono S-4

John Clinton Hartz S-43

Emeric Harvey N-67

Peter Paul Hashem N-2

Thomas Theodore Haskell, Jr. S-22

Timothy Shawn Haskell S-22

Joseph John Hasson III N-55

Leonard W. Hatton, Jr. S-26

Terence S. Hatton S-9

Michael Helmut Haub S-10

Timothy Aaron Haviland N-14

Donald G. Havlish, Jr. S-56

Anthony Maurice Hawkins N-31

Nobuhiro Hayatsu S-39

James Edward Hayden S-4

Robert Jay Hayes N-76

Philip T. Hayes, Ret. S-13

W. Ward Haynes N-49

Scott Jordan Hazelcorn N-54

Michael K. Healey S-12

Roberta B. Heber N-7

Charles Francis Xavier Heeran N-29

John F. Heffernan S-15

Michele M. Heidenberger S-69

Sheila M.S. Hein S-75

H. Joseph Heller, Jr. N-62

JoAnn L. Heltibridle N-14

Ronald John Hemenway S-71

Mark F. Hemschoot S-62

Ronnie Lee Henderson S-23

Brian Hennessey N-35

Edward R. Hennessy, Jr. N-76

Michelle Marie Henrique S-41

Joseph Patrick Henry S-10

William L. Henry, Jr. S-10

Catherina Henry-Robinson N-72

John Christopher Henwood N-52

Robert Allan Hepburn N-14

Mary Herencia S-55

Lindsay C. Herkness III S-46

Harvey Robert Hermer N-24

Norberto Hernandez N-68

Raul Hernandez N-31

Gary Herold S-58

Jeffrey Alan Hersch N-47

Thomas J. Hetzel S-17

Leon Bernard Heyward MC

Sundance S-36

Brian Christopher Hickey S-12

Enemencio Dario Hidalgo Cedeño N-69

Timothy Brian Higgins S-22

Robert D. W. Higley II S-59

Todd Russell Hill S-46

Clara Victorine Hinds N-69

Neal O. Hinds S-37

Mark Hindy N-25

Katsuyuki Hirai S-39

Heather Malia Ho N-70

Tara Yvette Hobbs S-59

Thomas Anderson Hobbs N-50

James J. Hobin N-9

Robert Wayne Hobson III N-49

DaJuan Hodges N-8

Ronald G. Hoerner S-65

Patrick A. Hoey N-66

John A. Hofer N-2

Marcia Hoffman N-36

Stephen Gerard Hoffman N-42

Frederick Joseph Hoffmann N-39

Michele L. Hoffmann N-39

Judith Florence Hofmiller N-16

Wallace Cole Hogan, Jr. S-74

Thomas Warren Hohlweck, Jr. S-60

Jonathan R. Hohmann S-8

Cora Hidalgo Holland N-2

John Holland N-70

Joseph F. Holland N-61

Jimmie I. Holley S-75

Elizabeth Holmes S-32

Thomas P. Holohan S-14

Herbert Wilson Homer S-2

LeRoy W. Homer, Jr. S-67

Bradley V. Hoorn N-58

James P. Hopper N-30

Montgomery McCullough Hord N-29

Michael Joseph Horn N-27

Matthew Douglas Horning N-16

Robert L. Horohoe, Jr. N-39

Michael Robert Horrocks S-2

Aaron Horwitz N-42

Charles J. Houston S-32

Uhuru G. Houston S-28

Angela M. Houtz S-73

George Gerard Howard S-28

Brady Kay Howell S-73

Michael C. Howell N-60

Steven Leon Howell N-3

Jennifer L. Howley and her unborn child S-56

Milagros Hromada S-55

Marian R. Hrycak S-48

Stephen Huczko, Jr. S-30

Kris Robert Hughes S-34

Paul Rexford Hughes N-16

Robert T. Hughes, Jr. N-73

Thomas F. Hughes, Jr. N-71

Timothy Robert Hughes N-44

Susan Huie N-20

Lamar Demetrius Hulse N-17

John Nicholas Humber, Jr. N-1

William Christopher Hunt S-33

Kathleen Anne Hunt-Casey S-50

Joseph Gerard Hunter S-8

Peggie M. Hurt S-75

Robert R. Hussa N-62

Stephen N. Hyland, Jr. S-74

Robert J. Hymel S-71

Thomas Edward Hynes S-37

Walter G. Hynes S-17

I

Joseph Anthony Ianelli N-9

Zuhtu Ibis N-36

Jonathan Lee Ielpi S-7

Michael Patrick Iken S-33

Daniel Ilkanayev N-48

Frederick J. Ill, Jr. S-16

Abraham Nethanel Ilowitz N-64

Anthony P. Infante, Jr. S-27

Louis S. Inghilterra S-43

Christopher Noble Ingrassia N-30

Paul Innella N-36

Stephanie Veronica Irby N-7

Douglas Jason Irgang S-50

Kristin Irvine-Ryan S-51

Todd Antione Isaac N-56

Erik Hans Isbrandtsen N-25

Taizo Ishikawa S-45

Waleed Joseph Iskandar N-1

Aram Iskenderian, Jr. N-47

John F. Iskyan N-52

Kazushige Ito S-45

Aleksandr Valeryevich Ivantsov N-27

Lacey Bernard Ivory S-74

J

Virginia May Jablonski N-5

Bryan C. Jack S-70

Brooke Alexandra Jackman N-41

Aaron Jeremy Jacobs N-29

Ariel Louis Jacobs N-21

Jason Kyle Jacobs S-40

Michael G. Jacobs S-42

Steven A. Jacobson N-71

Steven D. Jacoby S-70

Ricknauth Jaggernauth N-71

Jake Denis Jagoda N-34

Yudhvir S. Jain N-37

Maria Jakubiak N-11

Robert Adrien Jalbert S-2

Ernest James N-5

Gricelda E. James N-67

Mark Steven Jardim N-23

Amy Nicole Jarret S-2

Muhammadou Jawara N-70

Francois Jean-Pierre N-71

Maxima Jean-Pierre N-24

Paul Edward Jeffers N-52

John Charles Jenkins N-76

Joseph Jenkins, Jr. S-64

Alan Keith Jensen S-43

Prem Nath Jerath N-67

Farah Jeudy S-60

Hweidar Jian N-27

Eliezer Jimenez, Jr. N-69

Luis Jimenez, Jr. N-13

Charles Gregory John S-45

Nicholas John N-23

Dennis M. Johnson S-74

LaShawna Johnson N-72

Scott Michael Johnson S-33

William R. Johnston S-14

Allison Horstmann Jones S-51

Arthur Joseph Jones III N-59

Brian Leander Jones S-39

Charles Edward Jones N-74

Christopher D. Jones N-41

Donald T. Jones II N-43

Donald W. Jones N-55

Judith Lawter Jones S-73

Linda Jones S-56

Mary S. Jones N-65

Andrew Brian Jordan, Sr. S-22

Robert Thomas Jordan N-42

Albert Gunnis Joseph S-46

Ingeborg Joseph S-46

Karl Henry Joseph S-20

Stephen Joseph S-44

Jane Eileen Josiah S-43

Anthony Jovic S-10

Angel L. Juarbe, Jr. S-16

Karen Sue Juday N-31

Ann C. Judge S-70

Mychal F. Judge S-18

Paul William Jurgens S-30

Thomas Edward Jurgens S-26

K

Shashikiran Lakshmikantha

Kadaba N-18

Gavkharoy Kamardinova S-64

Shari Kandell N-32

Howard Lee Kane N-69

Jennifer Lynn Kane N-4

Vincent D. Kane S-18

Joon Koo Kang N-29

Sheldon Robert Kanter N-36

Deborah H. Kaplan N-66

Robin Lynne Kaplan N-1

Alvin Peter Kappelmann, Jr. S-63

Charles H. Karczewski S-56

William A. Karnes N-9

Douglas Gene Karpiloff S-26

Charles L. Kasper S-11

Andrew K. Kates N-38

John A. Katsimatides N-39

Robert Michael Kaulfers S-28

Don Jerome Kauth, Jr. S-36

Hideya Kawauchi S-44

Edward T. Keane N-66

Richard M. Keane N-15

Lisa Yvonne Kearney-Griffin N-18

Karol Ann Keasler S-34

Barbara A. Keating N-76

Paul Hanlon Keating S-5

Leo Russell Keene III S-33

Brenda Kegler S-1

Chandler Raymond Keller S-69

Joseph John Keller S-46

Peter R. Kellerman N-28

Joseph P. Kellett N-61

Frederick H. Kelley III N-43

James Joseph Kelly N-56

Joseph A. Kelly N-51

Maurice P. Kelly N-24

Richard John Kelly, Jr. S-15

Thomas Michael Kelly S-30

Thomas Richard Kelly S-20

Thomas W. Kelly S-20

Timothy Colin Kelly N-43

William Hill Kelly, Jr. N-21

Robert Clinton Kennedy N-12

Thomas J. Kennedy S-8

Yvonne E. Kennedy S-69

John Richard Keohane S-63

Ralph Francis Kershaw S-3

Ronald T. Kerwin S-8

Howard L. Kestenbaum S-53

Douglas D. Ketcham N-29

Ruth Ellen Ketler S-40

Boris Khalif N-17

Norma Cruz Khan S-71

Sarah Khan N-24

Taimour Firaz Khan N-62

Rajesh Khandelwal N-12

SeiLai Khoo N-59

Michael Vernon Kiefer S-22

Satoshi Kikuchihara S-39

Andrew Jay-Hoon Kim N-60

Lawrence Don Kim N-10

Mary Jo Kimelman N-54

Heinrich Kimmig S-3

Karen Ann Kincaid S-70

Amy R. King S-2

Andrew M. King N-44

Lucille Teresa King S-61

Robert King, Jr. S-14

Lisa King-Johnson S-36

Brian K. Kinney S-3

Takashi Kinoshita S-44

Chris Michael Kirby S-64

Robert Kirkpatrick N-73

Howard Barry Kirschbaum N-8

Glenn Davis Kirwin N-38

Helen Crossin Kittle and her

unborn child N-35

Richard Joseph Klares S-63

Peter Anton Klein N-17

Alan David Kleinberg N-52

Karen Joyce Klitzman N-45

Ronald Philip Kloepfer S-25

Stephen A. Knapp N-73

Eugueni Kniazev N-69

Andrew James Knox N-24

Thomas Patrick Knox N-50

Rebecca Lee Koborie N-4

Deborah A. Kobus S-39

Gary Edward Koecheler S-32

Frank J. Koestner N-28

Ryan Kohart N-27

Vanessa Lynn Przybylo Kolpak S-36

Irina Kolpakova S-45

Suzanne Rose Kondratenko S-63

Abdoulaye Koné N-68

Bon Seok Koo N-73

Dorota Kopiczko N-15

Scott Michael Kopytko S-21

Bojan George Kostic N-27

Danielle Kousoulis N-40

David P. Kovalcin N-2

John J. Kren S-32

William Edward Krukowski S-11

Lyudmila Ksido N-17

Toshiya Kuge S-68

Shekhar Kumar N-35

Kenneth Bruce Kumpel S-22

Frederick Kuo, Jr. S-65

Patricia A. Kuras N-3

Nauka Kushitani S-41

Thomas Joseph Kuveikis S-22

Victor Kwarkye N-68

Raymond Kui Fai Kwok N-33

Angela Reed Kyte N-11

L

Andrew La Corte N-62

Carol Ann La Plante N-15

Jeffrey G. La Touche N-70

Kathryn L. LaBorie S-2

Amarnauth Lachhman N-24

Ganesh K. Ladkat N-34

James Patrick Ladley N-40

Joseph A. Lafalce N-32

Jeanette Louise Lafond-Menichino N-10

David James LaForge S-12

Michael Patrick LaForte N-53

Alan Charles LaFrance N-69

Juan Mendez Lafuente N-71

Neil Kwong-Wah Lai S-47

Vincent Anthony Laieta S-53

William David Lake S-16

Franco Lalama N-66

Chow Kwan Lam S-48

Michael S. Lamana S-72

Stephen LaMantia N-56

Amy Hope Lamonsoff N-20

Robert T. Lane S-7

Brendan Mark Lang N-26

Rosanne P. Lang N-26

Vanessa Lang Langer and her

unborn child S-49

Mary Lou Langley S-53

Peter J. Langone S-23

Thomas Michael Langone S-23

Michele Bernadette Lanza S-40

Ruth Sheila Lapin S-37

Ingeborg A.D. Lariby S-49

Robin Blair Larkey N-44

Judith Camilla Larocque N-2

Christopher Randall Larrabee N-25

Hamidou S. Larry N-9

Scott Larsen S-21

John Adam Larson S-57

Natalie Janis Lasden N-75

Gary Edward Lasko N-7

Nicholas Craig Lassman N-36

Paul Laszczynski S-29

Charles A. Laurencin S-46

Stephen James Lauria N-7

Maria LaVache N-6

Denis Francis Lavelle N-16

Jeannine Mary LaVerde S-36

Anna A. Laverty S-39

Steven Lawn S-54

Robert A. Lawrence, Jr. S-49

Nathaniel Lawson N-23

David W. Laychak S-1

Eugen Gabriel Lazar N-33

James Patrick Leahy S-25

Joseph Gerard Leavey S-21

Neil J. Leavy S-13

Robert G. LeBlanc S-3

Leon Lebor N-64

Kenneth Charles Ledee N-14

Alan J. Lederman S-60

Elena F. Ledesma N-9

Alexis Leduc S-43

Daniel John Lee N-2

David S. Lee S-42

Dong Chul Lee S-70

Gary H. Lee N-35

Hyun Joon Lee S-48

Juanita Lee S-54

Kathryn Blair Lee N-9

Linda C. Lee N-22

Lorraine Mary Greene Lee S-56

Myoung Woo Lee S-47

Richard Y.C. Lee N-29

Stuart Soo-Jin Lee N-21

Yang Der Lee N-70

Stephen Paul Lefkowitz S-48

Adriana Legro N-61

Edward Joseph Lehman S-54

Eric Lehrfeld N-22

David R. Leistman N-39

David Prudencio Lemagne S-29

Joseph Anthony Lenihan S-34

John Joseph Lennon, Jr. S-28

John Robinson Lenoir S-52

Jorge Luis León, Sr. N-35

Matthew G. Leonard N-46

Michael Lepore N-13

Charles A. Lesperance N-71

Jeff LeVeen N-26

John Dennis Levi S-29

Alisha Caren Levin S-44

Neil David Levin N-65

Robert Levine N-39

Robert Michael Levine S-37

Shai Levinhar N-29

Daniel M. Lewin N-75

Adam Jay Lewis S-35

Jennifer Lewis S-69

Kenneth E. Lewis S-69

Margaret Susan Lewis N-66

Ye Wei Liang N-8

Orasri Liangthanasarn N-69

Daniel F. Libretti S-17

Ralph Michael Licciardi S-64

Edward Lichtschein N-36

Samantha L. Lightbourn-Allen S-76

Steven Barry Lillianthal N-56

Carlos R. Lillo S-11

Craig Damian Lilore N-25

Arnold Arboleda Lim S-41

Darya Lin S-63

Wei Rong Lin N-67

Nickie L. Lindo N-58

Thomas V. Linehan, Jr. N-12

Robert Thomas Linnane S-12

Alan Patrick Linton, Jr. S-52

Diane Theresa Lipari N-61

Kenneth P. Lira Arévalo S-45

Francisco Alberto Liriano N-58

Lorraine Lisi S-40

Paul Lisson S-49

Vincent M. Litto N-25

Ming-Hao Liu S-64

Nancy Liz S-56

Harold Lizcano N-59

Martin Lizzul N-36

George A. Llanes N-63

Elizabeth C. Logler N-34

Catherine Lisa Loguidice N-55

Jérôme Robert Lohez N-65

Michael William Lomax S-57

Stephen V. Long S-73

Laura Maria Longing N-8

Salvatore P. Lopes S-53

Daniel Lopez N-62

George Lopez S-41

Luis Manuel Lopez S-37

Maclovio Lopez, Jr. S-3

Manuel L. Lopez N-14

Joseph Lostrangio N-17

Chet Dek Louie N-46

Stuart Seid Louis S-50

Joseph Lovero S-29

Sara Elizabeth Low N-74

Jenny Seu Kueng Low Wong N-14

Michael W. Lowe S-46

Garry W. Lozier S-52

John P. Lozowsky N-17

Charles Peter Lucania S-64

Edward Hobbs Luckett N-55

Mark Gavin Ludvigsen S-36

Lee Charles Ludwig S-42

Sean Thomas Lugano S-35

Daniel Lugo S-65

Marie Lukas N-35

William Lum, Jr. N-18

Michael P. Lunden N-53

Christopher E. Lunder N-42

Anthony Luparello S-37

Gary Frederick Lutnick N-38

Linda Anne Luzzicone N-45

Alexander Lygin N-48

CeeCee Lyles S-67

Farrell Peter Lynch N-57

James Francis Lynch S-28

James T. Lynch, Jr. S-73

Louise A. Lynch N-15

Michael Cameron Lynch N-41

Michael Francis Lynch S-15

Michael Francis Lynch S-9

Richard D. Lynch, Jr. S-31

Robert Henry Lynch, Jr. S-26

Sean P. Lynch N-26

Sean Patrick Lynch N-57

Terence M. Lynch S-75

Michael J. Lyons S-13

Monica Anne Lyons N-0

Nehamon Lyons IV S-72

Patrick John Lyons S-23

M

Robert Francis Mace N-47

Marianne MacFarlane S-2

Jan Maciejewski N-69

Susan A. Mackay N-1

William Macko N-73

Catherine Fairfax MacRae N-59

Richard Blaine Madden S-58

Simon Maddison N-31

Noell C. Maerz S-30

Jennieann Maffeo N-73

Joseph Maffeo S-9

Jay Robert Magazine N-71

Brian Magee N-20

Charles W. Magee N-63

Joseph V. Maggitti N-4

Ronald Magnuson N-48

Daniel L. Maher N-13

Thomas A. Mahon N-51

William J. Mahoney S-11

Joseph Daniel Maio N-30

Linda C. Mair-Grayling N-8

Takashi Makimoto S-44

Abdu Ali Malahi S-45

Debora I. Maldonado N-0

Myrna T. Maldonado-Agosto N-66

Alfred Russell Maler N-54

Gregory James Malone S-32

Edward Francis Maloney III N-50

Joseph E. Maloney S-7

Gene Edward Maloy N-3

Christian H. Maltby N-44

Francisco Miguel Mancini N-71

Joseph Mangano N-3

Sara Elizabeth Manley N-59

Debra M. Mannetta N-61

Marion Victoria Manning N-13

Terence John Manning N-21

James Maounis S-40

Alfred Gilles Padre Joseph

Marchand S-2

Joseph Ross Marchbanks, Jr. S-5

Laura A. Marchese N-65

Hilda Marcin S-67

Peter Edward Mardikian N-21

Edward Joseph Mardovich S-33

Charles Joseph Margiotta S-16

Louis Neil Mariani S-4

Kenneth Joseph Marino S-9

Lester V. Marino N-24

Vita Marino S-51

Kevin D. Marlo S-50

Jose Juan Marrero S-32

John Daniel Marshall S-15

Shelley A. Marshall S-71

James Martello N-26

Michael A. Marti N-51

Karen Ann Martin N-74

Peter C. Martin S-18

Teresa M. Martin S-75

William J. Martin, Jr. N-51

Brian E. Martineau S-62

Betsy Martinez N-32

Edward J. Martinez N-35

Jose Angel Martinez, Jr. N-24

Robert Gabriel Martinez S-65

Waleska Martinez S-67

Lizie D. Martinez-Calderon S-55

Paul Richard Martini S-12

Anne Marie Martino-Cramer S-42

Joseph A. Mascali S-6

Bernard Mascarenhas N-7

Stephen Frank Masi N-35

Ada L. Mason-Acker S-1

Nicholas George Massa S-53

Patricia Ann Cimaroli Massari and her unborn child N-11

Michael Massaroli N-32

Philip William Mastrandrea, Jr. N-30

Rudy Mastrocinque N-5

Joseph Mathai N-21

Charles William Mathers N-4

William A. Mathesen S-32

Marcello Matricciano N-36

Margaret Elaine Mattic N-72

Dean E. Mattson S-74

Robert D. Mattson S-40

Walter A. Matuza, Jr. N-63

Timothy J. Maude S-74

Jill Maurer-Campbell S-37

Charles A. Mauro, Jr. S-56

Charles J. Mauro N-68

Dorothy Mauro N-9

Nancy T. Mauro N-8

Robert J. Maxwell S-1

Renée A. May and her unborn child S-69

Tyrone May S-48

Keithroy Marcellus Maynard S-14

Robert J. Mayo S-23

Kathy N. Mazza S-29

Edward Mazzella, Jr. N-28

Jennifer Lynn Mazzotta N-33

Kaaria Mbaya N-37

James Joseph McAlary, Jr. N-61

Brian Gerard McAleese S-15

Patricia Ann McAneney N-8

Colin R. McArthur S-58

John Kevin McAvoy S-6

Kenneth M. McBrayer S-52

Brendan F. McCabe S-43

Michael McCabe N-28

Thomas Joseph McCann S-14

Justin McCarthy N-30

Kevin M. McCarthy N-40

Michael Desmond McCarthy N-60

Robert G. McCarthy N-27

Stanley McCaskill N-16

Katie Marie McCloskey N-17

Juliana Valentine McCourt S-3

Ruth Magdaline McCourt S-3

Charles Austin McCrann N-12

Tonyell F. McDay N-13

Matthew T. McDermott N-30

Joseph P. McDonald N-45

Brian Grady McDonnell S-24

Michael P. McDonnell S-36

John F. McDowell, Jr. S-51

Eamon J. McEneaney N-57

John Thomas McErlean, Jr. N-39

Daniel Francis McGinley S-35

Mark Ryan McGinly N-60

William E. McGinn S-21

Thomas Henry McGinnis N-61

Michael Gregory McGinty N-4

Ann Walsh McGovern S-55

Scott Martin McGovern S-31

William J. McGovern S-6

Stacey Sennas McGowan S-51

Francis Noel McGuinn N-51

Thomas F. McGuinness, Jr. N-74

Patrick J. McGuire S-30

Thomas M. McHale N-56

Keith David McHeffey N-28

Ann M. McHugh S-30

Denis J. McHugh III S-33

Dennis P. McHugh S-18

Michael Edward McHugh, Jr. N-34

Robert G. McIlvaine N-22

Donald James McIntyre S-30

Stephanie Marie McKenna N-18

Molly L. McKenzie S-75

Barry J. McKeon S-40

Evelyn C. McKinnedy S-37

Darryl Leron McKinney N-29

George Patrick McLaughlin, Jr. N-59

Robert C. McLaughlin, Jr. N-52

Gavin McMahon S-59

Robert D. McMahon S-13

Edmund M. McNally S-43

Daniel Walker McNeal S-51

Walter Arthur McNeil S-28

Christine Sheila McNulty N-19

Sean Peter McNulty N-28

Robert William McPadden S-15

Terence A. McShane S-9

Timothy Patrick McSweeney S-7

Martin E. McWilliams S-17

Rocco A. Medaglia N-71

Abigail Medina N-16

Ana Iris Medina S-54

Damian Meehan N-61

William J. Meehan, Jr. N-27

Alok Kumar Mehta N-34

Raymond Meisenheimer S-14

Manuel Emilio Mejia N-69

Eskedar Melaku N-14

Antonio Melendez N-70

Mary P. Melendez S-43

Christopher D. Mello N-75

Yelena Melnichenko N-10

Stuart Todd Meltzer N-50

Diarelia Jovanah Mena N-27

Dora Marie Menchaca S-69

Charles R. Mendez S-20

Lizette Mendoza S-60

Shevonne Olicia Mentis N-7

Wolfgang Peter Menzel S-3

Steve John Mercado S-16

Wilfredo Mercado N-73

Wesley Mercer S-47

Ralph Joseph Mercurio N-50

Alan Harvey Merdinger N-0

George L. Merino S-42

Yamel Josefina Merino S-26

George Merkouris N-60

Deborah Merrick N-66

Raymond Joseph Metz III S-32

Jill Ann Metzler S-62

David Robert Meyer N-41

Nurul H. Miah N-15

William Edward Micciulli N-29

Martin Paul Michelstein S-63

Patricia E. Mickley S-71

Ronald D. Milam S-73

Peter Teague Milano N-40

Gregory Milanowycz S-58

Lukasz Tomasz Milewski N-23

Sharon Christina Millan S-45

Corey Peter Miller N-31

Craig J. Miller S-27

Douglas C. Miller S-6

Henry Alfred Miller, Jr. S-20

Joel Miller N-16

Michael Matthew Miller N-55

Nicole Carol Miller S-67

Philip D. Miller S-58

Robert Alan Miller S-48

Robert Cromwell Miller, Jr. S-61

Benny Millman S-64

Charles M. Mills, Jr. S-26

Ronald Keith Milstein S-39

Robert J. Minara S-22

William George Minardi N-54

Louis Joseph Minervino N-15

Thomas Mingione S-22

Wilbert Miraille N-31

Domenick N. Mircovich S-31

Rajesh Arjan Mirpuri N-21

Joseph D. Mistrulli N-71

Susan J. Miszkowicz N-66

Paul Thomas Mitchell S-20

Richard P. Miuccio S-47

Jeffrey Peter Mladenik N-1

Frank V. Moccia, Sr. S-65

Louis Joseph Modafferi S-6

Boyie Mohammed N-62

Dennis Mojica S-8

Manuel D. Mojica, Jr. S-21

Kleber Rolando Molina S-43

Manuel De Jesus Molina N-64

Carl Molinaro S-17

Justin John Molisani, Jr. S-30

Brian Patrick Monaghan S-64

Franklyn Monahan N-32

John Gerard Monahan N-33

Kristen Leigh Montanaro N-3

Craig Montano N-42

Michael G. Montesi S-9

Carlos Alberto Montoya N-75

Antonio De Jesus Montoya Valdes N-74

Cheryl Ann Monyak N-9

Thomas Carlo Moody S-18

Sharon Moore S-52

Krishna V. Moorthy S-43

Laura Lee Defazio Morabito N-75

Abner Morales S-41

Carlos Manuel Morales N-31

Paula E. Morales S-59

Sonia Mercedes Morales Puopolo N-76

Gerard P. Moran, Jr. S-73

John Christopher Moran N-20

John Michael Moran S-11

Kathleen Moran S-63

Lindsay Stapleton Morehouse S-36

George William Morell N-54

Steven P. Morello N-3

Vincent S. Morello S-16

Yvette Nicole Moreno N-59

Dorothy Morgan N-15

Richard J. Morgan S-30

Nancy Morgenstern N-31

Sanae Mori N-22

Blanca Robertina Morocho Morocho N-68

Leonel Geronimo Morocho Morocho N-68

Dennis Gerard Moroney N-47

Lynne Irene Morris N-33

Odessa V. Morris S-76

Seth Allan Morris N-54

Steve Morris N-19

Christopher Martel Morrison N-23

Ferdinand V. Morrone S-27

William David Moskal N-3

Brian A. Moss S-71

Marco Motroni N-62

Cynthia Motus-Wilson N-67

Iouri A. Mouchinski N-71

Jude Joseph Moussa N-50

Peter Moutos N-9

Damion O’Neil Mowatt N-23

Teddington H. Moy S-1

Christopher Michael Mozzillo S-7

Stephen Vincent Mulderry S-33

Richard T. Muldowney, Jr. S-21

Michael D. Mullan S-17

Dennis Michael Mulligan S-17

Peter James Mulligan N-29

Michael Joseph Mullin N-26

James Donald Munhall S-52

Nancy Muñiz N-65

Francisco Heladio Munoz N-4

Carlos Mario Muñoz N-70

Theresa Munson S-57

Robert Michael Murach N-47

Cesar Augusto Murillo N-29

Marc A. Murolo N-53

Brian Joseph Murphy N-55

Charles Anthony Murphy N-56

Christopher W. Murphy S-33

Edward Charles Murphy N-50

James F. Murphy IV N-23

James Thomas Murphy N-54

Kevin James Murphy N-5

Patrick Jude Murphy S-73

Patrick Sean Murphy N-5

Raymond E. Murphy S-19

Robert Eddie Murphy, Jr. S-45

John Joseph Murray N-45

John Joseph Murray S-45

Susan D. Murray N-14

Valerie Victoria Murray N-64

Richard Todd Myhre N-33

N

Louis J. Nacke II S-68

Robert B. Nagel S-10

Mildred Rose Naiman N-75

Takuya Nakamura N-63

Alexander John Robert Napier S-54

Frank Joseph Naples III N-45

John Philip Napolitano S-17

Catherine Ann Nardella S-61

Mario Nardone, Jr. S-30

Manika K. Narula N-33

Shawn M. Nassaney S-3

Narender Nath N-11

Karen Susan Navarro N-62

Joseph M. Navas S-28

Francis Joseph Nazario N-32

Glenroy I. Neblett N-18

Rayman Marcus Neblett S-60

Jerome O. Nedd N-71

Laurence F. Nedell S-58

Luke G. Nee N-43

Pete Negron S-0

Laurie Ann Neira N-76

Ann N. Nelson N-42

David William Nelson N-61

Ginger Risco Nelson N-60

James A. Nelson S-30

Michele Ann Nelson N-49

Peter Allen Nelson S-12

Oscar Francis Nesbitt S-47

Gerard Terence Nevins S-8

Renee Tetreault Newell N-74

Christopher C. Newton S-71

Christopher Newton-Carter S-51

Nancy Yuen Ngo N-17

Khang Ngoc Nguyen S-73

Jody Tepedino Nichilo N-47

Kathleen Ann Nicosia N-74

Martin Stewart Niederer N-26

Alfonse Joseph Niedermeyer S-28

Frank John Niestadt, Jr. S-62

Gloria Nieves S-40

Juan Nieves, Jr. N-70

Troy Edward Nilsen N-35

Paul Nimbley N-30

John Ballantine Niven S-61

Katherine McGarry Noack N-22

Curtis Terrance Noel N-72

Michael A. Noeth S-72

Daniel R. Nolan N-3

Robert Walter Noonan N-49

Jacqueline June Norton N-2

Robert Grant Norton N-2

Daniela Rosalia Notaro N-58

Brian Christopher Novotny N-45

Soichi Numata S-44

Brian Nunez N-45

Jose Nunez N-71

Jeffrey Roger Nussbaum N-62

O

James A. Oakley N-9

Dennis Patrick O'Berg S-20

James P. O'Brien, Jr. N-55

Michael P. O'Brien N-43

Scott J. O'Brien N-22

Timothy Michael O'Brien N-57

Daniel O'Callaghan S-10

Dennis James O'Connor, Jr. N-30

Diana J. O'Connor S-49

Keith Kevin O’Connor S-34

Richard J. O'Connor N-12

Amy O’Doherty N-39

Marni Pont O'Doherty S-36

Douglas E. Oelschlager S-20

Takashi Ogawa N-22

Albert Ogletree N-24

Philip Paul Ognibene S-36

John A. Ogonowski N-74

James Andrew O'Grady S-50

Joseph J. Ogren S-7

Thomas G. O'Hagan S-13

Samuel Oitice S-9

Patrick J. O'Keefe S-10

William O'Keefe S-11

Gerald Michael Olcott N-11

Gerald Thomas O’Leary N-27

Christine Anne Olender N-68

Linda Mary Oliva N-59

Edward K. Oliver N-61

Leah Elizabeth Oliver N-12

Eric Taube Olsen S-20

Jeffrey James Olsen S-5

Barbara K. Olson S-70

Maureen Lyons Olson N-7

Steven John Olson S-8

Matthew Timothy O'Mahony N-57

Toshihiro Onda S-44

Seamus L. Oneal N-37

John P. O'Neill N-63

Peter J. O'Neill, Jr. S-52

Sean Gordon Corbett O'Neill N-25

Betty Ann Ong N-74

Michael C. Opperman S-61

Christopher T. Orgielewicz S-49

Margaret Quinn Orloske N-8

Virginia Anne Ormiston N-5

Ruben S. Ornedo S-70

Kevin M. O’Rourke S-17

Ronald Orsini N-56

Peter Keith Ortale S-33

Juan Ortega-Campos S-38

Jane Marie Orth N-75

Alexander Ortiz N-65

David Ortiz S-27

Emilio Pete Ortiz N-62

Pablo Ortiz N-67

Paul Ortiz, Jr. N-21

Sonia Ortiz N-64

Masaru Ose S-44

Patrick J. O'Shea N-61

Robert William O’Shea N-60

Elsy Carolina Osorio Oliva N-72

James R. Ostrowski N-46

Timothy Franklin O’Sullivan N-73

Jason Douglas Oswald N-48

Michael John Otten S-16

Isidro D. Ottenwalder N-68

Michael Chung Ou S-48

Todd Joseph Ouida N-44

Jesus Ovalles N-69

Peter J. Owens, Jr. N-42

Adianes Oyola S-45

P

Angel M. Pabon, Jr. N-28

Israel Pabon, Jr. N-24

Roland Pacheco N-65

Michael Benjamin Packer N-22

Diana B. Padro S-76

Deepa Pakkala N-17

Jeffrey Matthew Palazzo S-5

Thomas Palazzo N-54

Richard A. Palazzolo N-54

Orio Joseph Palmer S-17

Frank Anthony Palombo S-21

Alan N. Palumbo N-51

Christopher Matthew Panatier N-45

Dominique Lisa Pandolfo N-14

Jonas Martin Panik S-73

Paul J. Pansini S-5

John M. Paolillo S-11

Edward Joseph Papa N-54

Salvatore T. Papasso S-26

James Nicholas Pappageorge S-14

Marie Pappalardo S-2

Vinod Kumar Parakat N-29

Vijayashanker Paramsothy S-57

Nitin Ramesh Parandkar N-19

Hardai Parbhu S-56

James Wendell Parham S-29

Debra Marie Paris S-53

George Paris N-33

Gye Hyong Park N-64

Philip Lacey Parker S-61

Michael Alaine Parkes N-12

Robert E. Parks, Jr. N-46

Hashmukh C. Parmar N-37

Robert Parro S-16

Diane Marie Parsons S-47

Leobardo Lopez Pascual N-70

Michael J. Pascuma, Jr. N-67

Jerrold Hughes Paskins N-17

Horace Robert Passananti N-11

Suzanne H. Passaro S-53

Avnish Ramanbhai Patel N-59

Dipti Patel N-33

Manish Patel S-30

Steven Bennett Paterson N-51

James Matthew Patrick N-51

Manuel D. Patrocino N-70

Bernard E. Patterson N-43

Clifford L. Patterson, Jr. S-74

Cira Marie Patti S-34

Robert E. Pattison N-63

James Robert Paul N-60

Patrice Paz S-61

Victor Hugo Paz N-69

Stacey Lynn Peak N-50

Richard Allen Pearlman S-27

Durrell V. Pearsall, Jr. S-11

Thomas Nicholas Pecorelli N-74

Thomas Pedicini N-42

Todd Douglas Pelino N-54

Mike Adrian Pelletier N-49

Anthony G. Peluso S-36

Angel R. Pena S-56

Robert Penninger S-69

Richard Al Penny S-49

Salvatore F. Pepe N-3

Carl Allen B. Peralta N-30

Robert David Peraza N-32

Jon A. Perconti, Jr. N-27

Alejo Perez N-67

Angel Perez, Jr. N-33

Angela Susan Perez N-32

Anthony Perez N-37

Ivan Antonio Perez S-41

Nancy E. Perez N-66

Berry Berenson Perkins N-76

Joseph John Perroncino N-32

Edward J. Perrotta N-50

Emelda H. Perry S-64

Glenn C. Perry, Sr. S-22

John William Perry S-24

Franklin Allan Pershep S-56

Danny Pesce N-55

Michael John Pescherine S-34

Davin N. Peterson N-28

Donald Arthur Peterson S-67

Jean Hoadley Peterson S-67

William Russell Peterson N-15

Mark James Petrocelli N-61

Philip Scott Petti S-16

Glen Kerrin Pettit S-25

Dominick A. Pezzulo S-29

Kaleen Elizabeth Pezzuti N-54

Kevin J. Pfeifer S-14

Tu-Anh Pham N-60

Kenneth John Phelan, Sr. S-13

Sneha Anne Philip S-66

Eugenia McCann Piantieri N-13

Ludwig John Picarro S-63

Matthew Picerno N-43

Joseph O. Pick S-41

Christopher J. Pickford S-12

Dennis J. Pierce S-47

Bernard Pietronico N-41

Nicholas P. Pietrunti N-30

Theodoros Pigis S-49

Susan Elizabeth Pinto N-35

Joseph Piskadlo N-63

Christopher Todd Pitman N-45

Joshua Michael Piver N-33

Robert R. Ploger III S-71

Zandra F. Ploger S-71

Joseph Plumitallo N-41

John M. Pocher N-41

William Howard Pohlmann S-47

Laurence Michael Polatsch N-27

Thomas H. Polhemus N-17

Steve Pollicino N-39

Susan M. Pollio S-33

Darin H. Pontell S-73

Joshua Iosua Poptean N-71

Giovanna Porras N-72

Anthony Portillo S-49

James Edward Potorti N-11

Daphne Pouletsos S-55

Richard N. Poulos N-30

Stephen Emanual Poulos S-60

Brandon Jerome Powell N-23

Scott Alan Powell S-75

Shawn Edward Powell S-20

Antonio Dorsey Pratt N-23

Gregory M. Preziose N-53

Wanda Ivelisse Prince S-42

Vincent A. Princiotta S-20

Kevin M. Prior S-22

Everett Martin Proctor III N-48

Carrie Beth Progen S-59

David Lee Pruim S-62

Richard A. Prunty S-5

John Foster Puckett N-68

Robert David Pugliese N-10

Edward F. Pullis S-62

Patricia Ann Puma N-64

Jack D. Punches S-73

Hemanth Kumar Puttur N-17

Joseph J. Pycior, Jr. S-72

Edward R. Pykon N-61

Q

Christopher Quackenbush S-52

Lars Peter Qualben N-15

Lincoln Quappé S-16

Beth Ann Quigley N-27

Patrick J. Quigley IV S-4

Michael T. Quilty S-15

James Francis Quinn N-30

Ricardo J. Quinn S-18

R

Carol Millicent Rabalais S-61

Christopher Peter Anthony

Racaniello N-32

Leonard J. Ragaglia S-10

Eugene J. Raggio S-24

Laura Marie Ragonese-Snik S-54

Michael Paul Ragusa S-23

Peter Frank Raimondi N-59

Harry A. Raines N-36

Lisa J. Raines S-71

Ehtesham Raja S-39

Valsa Raju N-63

Edward J. Rall S-17

Lukas Rambousek N-58

Maria Ramirez S-45

Harry Ramos N-63

Vishnoo Ramsaroop N-64

Deborah A. Ramsaur S-1

Lorenzo E. Ramzey S-55

Alfred Todd Rancke S-50

Adam David Rand S-8

Jonathan C. Randall N-6

Shreyas S. Ranganath N-7

Anne T. Ransom N-18

Faina Rapoport N-17

Rhonda Sue Rasmussen S-76

Robert A. Rasmussen S-37

Amenia Rasool N-11

R. Mark Rasweiler N-9

Marsha D. Ratchford S-72

David Alan James Rathkey S-46

William Ralph Raub N-25

Gerard F. Rauzi S-47

Alexey Razuvaev S-32

Gregory Reda N-6

Sarah Anne Redheffer N-20

Michele Marie Reed S-62

Judith Ann Reese N-67

Donald J. Regan S-14

Robert M. Regan S-10

Thomas Michael Regan S-54

Christian Michael Otto Regenhard S-23

Howard Reich S-49

Gregg Reidy N-28

James Brian Reilly S-34

Kevin O. Reilly S-20

Timothy E. Reilly N-11

Joseph Reina, Jr. N-33

Thomas Barnes Reinig N-55

Frank Bennett Reisman N-28

Joshua Scott Reiss N-51

Karen Renda N-18

John Armand Reo N-40

Richard Cyril Rescorla S-46

John Thomas Resta N-62

Sylvia San Pio Resta and her

unborn child N-62

Martha M. Reszke S-1

David E. Retik N-1

Todd H. Reuben S-69

Luis Clodoaldo Revilla Mier S-65

Eduvigis Reyes, Jr. N-72

Bruce Albert Reynolds S-28

John Frederick Rhodes S-55

Francis Saverio Riccardelli S-25

Rudolph N. Riccio N-34

Ann Marie Riccoboni N-64

David Harlow Rice S-52

Eileen Mary Rice N-6

Kenneth Frederick Rice III N-13

CeCelia E. Richard S-76

Vernon Allan Richard S-20

Claude Daniel Richards S-25

Gregory David Richards N-39

Michael Richards N-63

Venesha Orintia Richards N-6

Jimmy Riches S-21

Alan Jay Richman N-11

John M. Rigo N-10

Frederick Charles Rimmele III S-2

Rose Mary Riso S-47

Moises N. Rivas N-67

Joseph R. Rivelli, Jr. S-22

Carmen Alicia Rivera S-42

Isaias Rivera N-63

Juan William Rivera N-72

Linda Ivelisse Rivera N-15

David E. Rivers N-20

Joseph R. Riverso N-51

Paul V. Rizza S-40

John Frank Rizzo S-64

Stephen Louis Roach N-54

Joseph Roberto S-35

Leo Arthur Roberts N-43

Michael E. Roberts S-21

Michael Edward Roberts S-16

Donald Walter Robertson, Jr. N-45

Jeffrey Robinson N-16

Michell Lee Jean Robotham S-56

Donald Arthur Robson N-39

Antonio A. Rocha N-51

Raymond James Rocha N-44

Laura Rockefeller N-20

John Michael Rodak S-51

Antonio José Rodrigues S-29

Anthony Rodriguez S-22

Carmen Milagros Rodriguez S-58

Gregory E. Rodriguez N-48

Marsha A. Rodriguez N-6

Mayra Valdes Rodriguez S-59

Richard Rodriguez S-29

David Bartolo Rodriguez-Vargas N-69

Matthew Rogan S-14

Jean Destrehan Rogér N-74

Karlie Rogers N-20

Scott William Rohner N-44

Keith Michael Roma S-25

Joseph M. Romagnolo N-24

Efrain Romero, Sr. S-44

Elvin Romero N-28

James A. Romito S-27

Sean Paul Rooney S-57

Eric Thomas Ropiteau N-33

Aida Rosario N-18

Angela Rosario N-29

Mark H. Rosen S-52

Brooke David Rosenbaum N-33

Linda Rosenbaum N-12

Sheryl Lynn Rosenbaum N-47

Lloyd Daniel Rosenberg N-40

Mark Louis Rosenberg N-7

Andrew Ira Rosenblum N-40

Joshua M. Rosenblum N-27

Joshua Alan Rosenthal S-41

Richard David Rosenthal N-48

Philip Martin Rosenzweig N-2

Daniel Rosetti S-64

Richard Barry Ross N-2

Norman S. Rossinow S-61

Nicholas P. Rossomando S-5

Michael Craig Rothberg N-29

Donna Marie Rothenberg S-60

Mark David Rothenberg S-68

James Michael Roux S-2

Nicholas Charles Alexander Rowe N-23

Edward V. Rowenhorst S-76

Judy Rowlett S-1

Timothy Alan Roy, Sr. S-24

Paul G. Ruback S-21

Ronald J. Ruben S-34

Joanne Rubino N-14

David M. Ruddle S-66

Bart Joseph Ruggiere N-49

Susan A. Ruggiero N-13

Adam Keith Ruhalter N-47

Gilbert Ruiz N-69

Robert E. Russell S-1

Stephen P. Russell S-7

Steven Harris Russin N-52

Michael Thomas Russo, Sr. S-7

Wayne Alan Russo N-6

William R. Ruth S-74

Edward Ryan N-61

John Joseph Ryan S-34

Jonathan Stephan Ryan S-30

Matthew L. Ryan S-9

Tatiana Ryjova S-48

Christina Sunga Ryook N-49

S

Thierry Saada N-41

Jason Elazar Sabbag S-42

Thomas E. Sabella S-17

Scott H. Saber N-23

Charles E. Sabin, Sr. S-71

Joseph Francis Sacerdote N-44

Jessica Leigh Sachs N-74

Francis John Sadocha N-24

Jude Elias Safi N-26

Brock Joel Safronoff N-7

Edward Saiya S-45

John Patrick Salamone N-40

Marjorie C. Salamone S-75

Hernando Rafael Salas S-38

Juan G. Salas N-70

Esmerlin Antonio Salcedo S-65

John Pepe Salerno N-30

Rahma Salie and her unborn child N-1

Richard L. Salinardi, Jr. S-37

Wayne John Saloman N-35

Nolbert Salomon S-46

Catherine Patricia Salter S-60

Frank G. Salvaterra S-51

Paul Richard Salvio N-62

Samuel Robert Salvo, Jr. S-59

Carlos Alberto Samaniego N-42

John P. Sammartino S-71

James Kenneth Samuel, Jr. N-60

Michael San Phillip S-51

Hugo M. Sanay S-31

Alva Cynthia Jeffries Sanchez N-16

Jacquelyn Patrice Sanchez N-47

Jesus Sanchez S-2

Raymond Sanchez S-66

Eric M. Sand N-28

Stacey Leigh Sanders N-3

Herman S. Sandler S-52

Jim Sands, Jr. N-36

Ayleen J. Santiago N-65

Kirsten Reese Santiago N-67

Maria Theresa Concepcion

Santillan N-36

Susan Gayle Santo N-9

Christopher A. Santora S-10

John August Santore S-5

Mario L. Santoro S-26

Rafael Humberto Santos N-34

Rufino C.F. Santos III N-17

Victor J. Saracini S-2

Kalyan K. Sarkar N-66

Chapelle Renee Stewart Sarker N-14

Paul F. Sarle N-56

Deepika Kumar Sattaluri N-18

Gregory Thomas Saucedo S-6

Susan M. Sauer N-11

Anthony Savas N-67

Vladimir Savinkin N-48

John Michael Sbarbaro N-56

David M. Scales S-74

Robert Louis Scandole N-52

Michelle Scarpitta S-31

Dennis Scauso S-8

John Albert Schardt S-12

John G. Scharf S-63

Fred C. Scheffold, Jr. S-6

Angela Susan Scheinberg N-64

Scott Mitchell Schertzer N-33

Sean Schielke N-44

Steven Francis Schlag N-51

Robert A. Schlegel S-72

Jon Schlissel S-48

Karen Helene Schmidt S-46

Ian Schneider N-52

Thomas G. Schoales S-21

Marisa Dinardo Schorpp N-49

Frank G. Schott, Jr. N-13

Gerard Patrick Schrang S-14

Jeffrey H. Schreier N-31

John T. Schroeder N-59

Susan Lee Schuler S-53

Edward W. Schunk N-55

Mark Evan Schurmeier N-22

John Burkhart Schwartz N-40

Mark Schwartz S-26

Adriane Victoria Scibetta N-48

Raphael Scorca N-3

Janice M. Scott S-1

Randolph Scott S-31

Christopher Jay Scudder S-37

Arthur Warren Scullin N-14

Michael H. Seaman N-46

Margaret M. Seeliger S-53

Anthony Segarra N-64

Carlos Segarra N-72

Jason M. Sekzer N-31

Matthew Carmen Sellitto N-46

Michael L. Selves S-75

Howard Selwyn S-31

Larry John Senko N-65

Arturo Angelo Sereno N-58

Frankie Serrano S-45

Marian H. Serva S-75

Alena Sesinova N-3

Adele Christine Sessa N-27

Sita Nermalla Sewnarine S-43

Karen Lynn Seymour N-73

Davis Grier Sezna, Jr. S-52

Thomas Joseph Sgroi N-8

Jayesh Shantilal Shah N-37

Khalid M. Shahid N-33

Mohammed Shajahan N-14

Gary Shamay N-31

Earl Richard Shanahan N-5

Dan F. Shanower S-72

Neil G. Shastri N-58

Kathryn Anne Shatzoff N-10

Barbara A. Shaw N-20

Jeffrey James Shaw N-24

Robert John Shay, Jr. N-53

Daniel James Shea N-38

Joseph Patrick Shea N-38

Kathleen Shearer S-3

Robert M. Shearer S-3

Linda June Sheehan S-50

Hagay Shefi N-21

Antionette M. Sherman S-75

John Anthony Sherry S-30

Atsushi Shiratori N-44

Thomas Joseph Shubert N-29

Mark Shulman N-10

See Wong Shum N-71

Allan Abraham Shwartzstein N-30

Clarin Shellie Siegel-Schwartz S-53

Johanna Sigmund N-60

Dianne T. Signer and her unborn child N-60

Gregory Sikorsky S-12

Stephen Gerard Siller S-5

David Silver N-29

Craig A. Silverstein S-50

Nasima H. Simjee S-41

Bruce Edward Simmons S-51

Diane M. Simmons S-69

Donald D. Simmons S-76

George W. Simmons S-69

Arthur Simon N-58

Kenneth Alan Simon N-58

Michael J. Simon N-49

Paul Joseph Simon N-17

Marianne Liquori Simone N-35

Barry Simowitz S-48

Jane Louise Simpkin S-2

Jeff Lyal Simpson S-27

Cheryle D. Sincock S-75

Khamladai Khami Singh N-68

Roshan Ramesh Singh N-68

Thomas E. Sinton III N-55

Peter A. Siracuse N-39

Muriel F. Siskopoulos S-33

Joseph Michael Sisolak N-6

John P. Skala S-27

Francis Joseph Skidmore, Jr. S-32

Toyena Corliss Skinner N-72

Paul Albert Skrzypek N-50

Christopher Paul Slattery N-30

Vincent Robert Slavin N-27

Robert F. Sliwak N-56

Paul Kenneth Sloan S-33

Stanley S. Smagala, Jr. S-15

Wendy L. Small N-54

Gregg H. Smallwood S-72

Catherine T. Smith N-16

Daniel Laurence Smith S-31

Gary F. Smith S-1

George Eric Smith S-39

Heather Lee Smith N-75

James Gregory Smith N-40

Jeffrey R. Smith S-52

Joyce Patricia Smith N-24

Karl T. Smith, Sr. N-43

Kevin Joseph Smith S-9

Leon Smith, Jr. S-11

Moira Ann Smith S-24

Monica Rodriguez Smith and her unborn child N-73

Rosemary A. Smith N-73

Bonnie Shihadeh Smithwick N-61

Rochelle Monique Snell S-49

Christine Ann Snyder S-67

Dianne Bullis Snyder N-74

Leonard J. Snyder, Jr. S-54

Astrid Elizabeth Sohan N-6

Sushil S. Solanki N-34

Rubén Solares N-31

Naomi Leah Solomon N-21

Daniel W. Song N-56

Mari-Rae Sopper S-69

Michael Charles Sorresse N-5

Fabian Soto N-63

Timothy Patrick Soulas N-44

Gregory Thomas Spagnoletti S-35

Donald F. Spampinato, Jr. N-39

Thomas Sparacio S-32

John Anthony Spataro N-10

Robert W. Spear, Jr. S-19

Robert Speisman S-70

Maynard S. Spence, Jr. N-6

George Edward Spencer III S-31

Robert Andrew Spencer N-45

Mary Rubina Sperando N-21

Frank Spinelli N-44

William E. Spitz N-42

Joseph Patrick Spor, Jr. S-15

Klaus Johannes Sprockamp S-47

Saranya Srinuan N-52

Fitzroy St. Rose N-72

Michael F. Stabile S-32

Lawrence T. Stack S-18

Timothy M. Stackpole S-20

Richard James Stadelberger S-40

Eric Adam Stahlman N-46

Gregory Stajk S-17

Alexandru Liviu Stan N-34

Corina Stan N-34

Mary Domenica Stanley N-14

Anthony Starita N-42

Jeffrey Stark S-13

Derek James Statkevicus S-34

Patricia J. Statz S-75

Craig William Staub S-34

William V. Steckman N-67

Eric Thomas Steen S-30

William R. Steiner N-12

Alexander Robbins Steinman N-25

Edna L. Stephens S-1

Andrew Stergiopoulos N-45

Andrew J. Stern N-43

Norma Lang Steuerle S-69

Martha Jane Stevens S-62

Michael James Stewart N-61

Richard H. Stewart, Jr. N-41

Sanford M. Stoller N-17

Douglas Joel Stone N-74

Lonny Jay Stone N-63

Jimmy Nevill Storey N-12

Timothy Stout N-35

Thomas Strada N-40

James J. Straine, Jr. N-52

Edward W. Straub S-55

George J. Strauch, Jr. S-60

Edward Thomas Strauss S-24

Steven R. Strauss S-46

Larry L. Strickland S-74

Steven F. Strobert N-55

Walwyn Wellington Stuart, Jr. S-29

Benjamin Suarez S-11

David Scott Suarez N-17

Ramon Suarez S-25

Dino Xavier Suarez Ramirez N-75

Yoichi Sumiyama Sugiyama S-44

William Christopher Sugra N-34

Daniel Thomas Suhr S-14

David Marc Sullins S-25

Christopher P. Sullivan S-22

Patrick Sullivan N-40

Thomas G. Sullivan N-67

Hilario Soriano Sumaya, Jr. N-8

James Joseph Suozzo N-41

Colleen M. Supinski S-51

Robert Sutcliffe N-67

Seline Sutter N-65

Claudia Suzette Sutton N-48

John Francis Swaine N-39

Kristine M. Swearson N-34

Brian David Sweeney S-2

Brian Edward Sweeney S-9

Madeline Amy Sweeney N-74

Kenneth J. Swenson N-48

Thomas F. Swift S-46

Derek Ogilvie Sword S-35

Kevin Thomas Szocik S-35

Gina Sztejnberg N-15

Norbert P. Szurkowski N-50

T

Harry Taback N-4

Joann C. Tabeek N-35

Norma C. Taddei N-13

Michael Taddonio S-31

Keiichiro Takahashi S-32

Keiji Takahashi S-44

Phyllis Gail Talbot N-11

Robert R. Talhami N-27

John Talignani S-68

Sean Patrick Tallon S-5

Paul Talty S-24

Maurita Tam S-53

Rachel Tamares S-61

Hector Rogan Tamayo S-45

Michael Andrew Tamuccio N-59

Kenichiro Tanaka S-44

Rhondelle Cherie Tankard S-59

Michael Anthony Tanner N-25

Dennis Gerard Taormina, Jr. N-12

Kenneth Joseph Tarantino N-46

Allan Tarasiewicz S-7

Michael C. Tarrou S-2

Ronald Tartaro N-60

Deborah Tavolarella S-2

Darryl Anthony Taylor N-72

Donnie Brooks Taylor S-59

Hilda E. Taylor S-70

Kip P. Taylor S-74

Leonard E. Taylor S-71

Lorisa Ceylon Taylor N-15

Michael Morgan Taylor N-40

Sandra C. Taylor S-1

Sandra Dawn Teague S-69

Karl W. Teepe S-71

Paul A. Tegtmeier S-21

Yeshavant Moreshwar Tembe S-47

Anthony Tempesta N-53

Dorothy Pearl Temple S-47

Stanley L. Temple N-31

David Gustaf Peter Tengelin N-4

Brian John Terrenzi N-47

Lisa Marie Terry N-11

Goumatie Thackurdeen S-41

Harshad Sham Thatte N-17

Michael Theodoridis N-1

Thomas F. Theurkauf, Jr. S-36

Lesley Anne Thomas N-49

Brian Thomas Thompson S-44

Clive Ian Thompson S-32

Glenn Thompson N-43

Nigel Bruce Thompson N-44

Perry A. Thompson S-60

Vanavah Alexei Thompson N-64

William H. Thompson S-26

Eric Raymond Thorpe S-35

Nichola Angela Thorpe S-33

Tamara C. Thurman S-74

Sal Edward Tieri, Jr. N-10

John Patrick Tierney S-13

Mary Ellen Tiesi S-62

William Randolph Tieste N-25

Kenneth Tietjen S-29

Stephen Edward Tighe N-56

Scott Charles Timmes N-62

Michael E. Tinley N-15

Jennifer M. Tino N-11

Robert Frank Tipaldi N-26

John James Tipping II S-10

David Tirado N-23

Hector Luis Tirado, Jr. S-15

Michelle Lee Titolo N-48

Alicia Nicole Titus S-2

John J. Tobin N-8

Richard J. Todisco S-51

Otis V. Tolbert S-73

Vladimir Tomasevic N-22

Stephen Kevin Tompsett N-22

Thomas Tong S-39

Doris Torres S-42

Luis Eduardo Torres N-51

Amy Elizabeth Toyen N-23

Christopher Michael Traina N-63

Daniel Patrick Trant N-43

Abdoul Karim Traore N-68

Glenn J. Travers, Sr. N-32

Walter Philip Travers N-56

Felicia Yvette Traylor-Bass N-65

James Anthony Trentini N-2

Mary Barbara Trentini N-2

Lisa L. Trerotola N-67

Karamo Baba Trerra S-39

Michael Angel Trinidad N-31

Francis Joseph Trombino S-38

Gregory James Trost S-33

Willie Q. Troy S-1

William P. Tselepis, Jr. N-45

Zhanetta Valentinovna Tsoy N-13

Michael Patrick Tucker N-28

Lance Richard Tumulty S-31

Ching Ping Tung S-44

Simon James Turner N-20

Donald Joseph Tuzio S-39

Robert T. Twomey N-67

Jennifer Lynn Tzemis N-58

U

John G. Ueltzhoeffer N-15

Tyler Victor Ugolyn N-59

Michael A. Uliano N-56

Jonathan J. Uman N-38

Anil Shivhari Umarkar N-34

Allen V. Upton N-39

Diane Marie Urban S-47

V

John Damien Vaccacio N-43

Bradley Hodges Vadas S-35

William Valcarcel S-48

Felix Antonio Vale N-32

Ivan Vale N-32

Benito Valentin N-18

Santos Valentin, Jr. S-25

Carlton Francis Valvo II N-46

Pendyala Vamsikrishna N-74

Erica H. Van Acker S-55

Kenneth W. Van Auken N-52

R. Bruce Van Hine S-13

Daniel M. Van Laere S-62

Edward Raymond Vanacore S-41

Jon Charles Vandevander N-62

Frederick T. Varacchi N-38

Gopalakrishnan Varadhan N-46

David Vargas S-49

Scott C. Vasel N-16

Azael Ismael Vasquez N-24

Ronald J. Vauk S-73

Arcangel Vazquez S-41

Santos Vazquez N-31

Peter Vega S-11

Sankara Sastry Velamuri S-47

Jorge Velazquez S-47

Lawrence G. Veling S-7

Anthony Mark Ventura S-41

David Vera S-31

Loretta Ann Vero N-18

Christopher James Vialonga N-62

Matthew Gilbert Vianna N-34

Robert Anthony Vicario N-24

Celeste Torres Victoria N-20

Joanna Vidal N-20

John T. Vigiano II S-23

Joseph Vincent Vigiano S-23

Frank J. Vignola, Jr. N-48

Joseph Barry Vilardo N-28

Claribel Villalobos Hernandez N-23

Sergio Gabriel Villanueva S-23

Chantal Vincelli N-21

Melissa Renée Vincent N-65

Francine Ann Virgilio S-61

Lawrence Virgilio S-20

Joseph Gerard Visciano S-34

Joshua S. Vitale N-26

Maria Percoco Vola S-62

Lynette D. Vosges S-59

Garo H. Voskerijian N-13

Alfred Anton Vukosa N-35

W

Gregory Kamal Bruno Wachtler N-60

Karen J. Wagner S-74

Mary Alice Wahlstrom N-1

Honor Elizabeth Wainio S-67

Gabriela Silvina Waisman N-23

Wendy Alice Rosario Wakeford N-53

Courtney Wainsworth Walcott S-46

Victor Wald N-63

Kenneth E. Waldie N-2

Benjamin James Walker N-16

Glen Wall N-57

Mitchel Scott Wallace S-26

Peter Guyder Wallace N-6

Robert Francis Wallace S-12

Roy Michael Wallace N-44

Jeanmarie Wallendorf S-36

Matthew Blake Wallens N-39

Meta L. Waller S-1

John Wallice, Jr. N-30

Barbara P. Walsh N-9

Jim Walsh N-34

Jeffrey P. Walz S-14

Ching Wang S-44

Weibin Wang N-36

Michael Warchola S-6

Stephen Gordon Ward N-48

Timothy Ray Ward S-2

James A. Waring N-31

Brian G. Warner N-37

Derrick Christopher Washington S-66

Charles Waters N-32

James Thomas Waters, Jr. S-34

Patrick J. Waters S-8

Kenneth Thomas Watson S-21

Michael Henry Waye N-8

Todd Christopher Weaver S-43

Walter Edward Weaver S-25

Nathaniel Webb S-28

Dinah Webster N-20

William Michael Weems S-4

Joanne Flora Weil S-45

Michael T. Weinberg S-17

Steven Weinberg S-37

Scott Jeffrey Weingard N-27

Steven George Weinstein N-13

Simon Weiser N-65

David M. Weiss S-8

David Thomas Weiss N-46

Chin Sun Pak Wells S-74

Vincent Michael Wells N-44

Deborah Jacobs Welsh S-67

Timothy Matthew Welty S-7

Christian Hans Rudolf Wemmers N-21

Ssu-Hui Wen N-34

John Joseph Wenckus N-2

Oleh D. Wengerchuk S-65

Peter M. West N-43

Whitfield West, Jr. N-35

Meredith Lynn Whalen N-60

Eugene Michael Whelan S-12

Adam S. White N-50

Edward James White III S-13

James Patrick White N-39

John Sylvester White N-63

Kenneth Wilburn White, Jr. N-24

Leonard Anthony White S-66

Malissa Y. White N-15

Maudlyn A. White S-74

Sandra L. White S-75

Wayne White N-9

Leanne Marie Whiteside S-59

Mark P. Whitford S-15

Leslie A. Whittington S-69

Michael T. Wholey S-29

Mary Lenz Wieman S-59

Jeffrey David Wiener N-12

William J. Wik S-60

Alison Marie Wildman N-61

Glenn E. Wilkinson S-14

Ernest M. Willcher S-75

John Charles Willett N-50

Brian Patrick Williams N-41

Candace Lee Williams N-75

Crossley Richard Williams, Jr. S-41

David J. Williams N-64

David Lucian Williams S-73

Debbie L. Williams S-54

Dwayne Williams S-74

Kevin Michael Williams S-50

Louie Anthony Williams N-66

Louis Calvin Williams III S-37

John P. Williamson S-8

Donna Ann Wilson S-56

William Eben Wilson S-61

David Harold Winton S-35

Glenn J. Winuk S-27

Thomas Francis Wise N-9

Alan L. Wisniewski S-52

Frank Paul Wisniewski N-53

David Wiswall S-55

Sigrid Charlotte Wiswe N-18

Michael R. Wittenstein N-52

Christopher W. Wodenshek N-49

Martin Phillips Wohlforth S-52

Katherine Susan Wolf N-3

Jennifer Yen Wong N-20

Siucheung Steve Wong N-4

Yin Ping Wong S-60

Yuk Ping Wong S-48

Brent James Woodall S-33

James John Woods N-26

Marvin Roger Woods S-73

Patrick J. Woods S-64

Richard Herron Woodwell S-35

David Terence Wooley S-9

John Bentley Works S-34

Martin Michael Wortley N-46

Rodney James Wotton S-43

William Wren, Ret. S-22

John W. Wright, Jr. S-50

Neil Robin Wright N-46

Sandra Lee Wright S-57

Y

Jupiter Yambem N-69

John D. Yamnicky, Sr. S-71

Suresh Yanamadala N-16

Vicki Yancey S-70

Shuyin Yang S-70

Matthew David Yarnell S-41

Myrna Yaskulka N-60

Shakila Yasmin N-15

Olabisi Shadie Layeni Yee N-67

Kevin W. Yokum S-72

Edward P. York N-49

Kevin Patrick York S-31

Raymond R. York S-20

Suzanne Martha Youmans S-54

Barrington Leroy Young, Jr. S-31

Donald McArthur Young S-72

Edmond G. Young, Jr. S-74

Jacqueline Young N-3

Lisa L. Young S-1

Elkin Yuen N-61

Z

Joseph C. Zaccoli N-43

Adel Agayby Zakhary N-63

Arkady Zaltsman S-63

Edwin J. Zambrana, Jr. S-49

Robert Alan Zampieri N-62

Mark Zangrilli S-63

Christopher R. Zarba, Jr. N-1

Ira Zaslow S-46

Kenneth Albert Zelman N-19

Abraham J. Zelmanowitz N-65

Martin Morales Zempoaltecatl N-68

Zhe Zeng S-37

Marc Scott Zeplin N-27

Jie Yao Justin Zhao S-39

Yuguang Zheng S-70

Ivelin Ziminski N-5

Michael Joseph Zinzi N-14

Charles Alan Zion N-25

Julie Lynne Zipper S-49

Salvatore J. Zisa N-5

Prokopios Paul Zois N-18

Joseph J. Zuccala S-44

Andrew Steven Zucker S-45

Igor Zukelman S-43
